= Albufera Natural Park =

Natural park in Valencia, Spain

La Albufera
- L'Albufera
- IUCN category VI (protected area with sustainable use of natural resources)
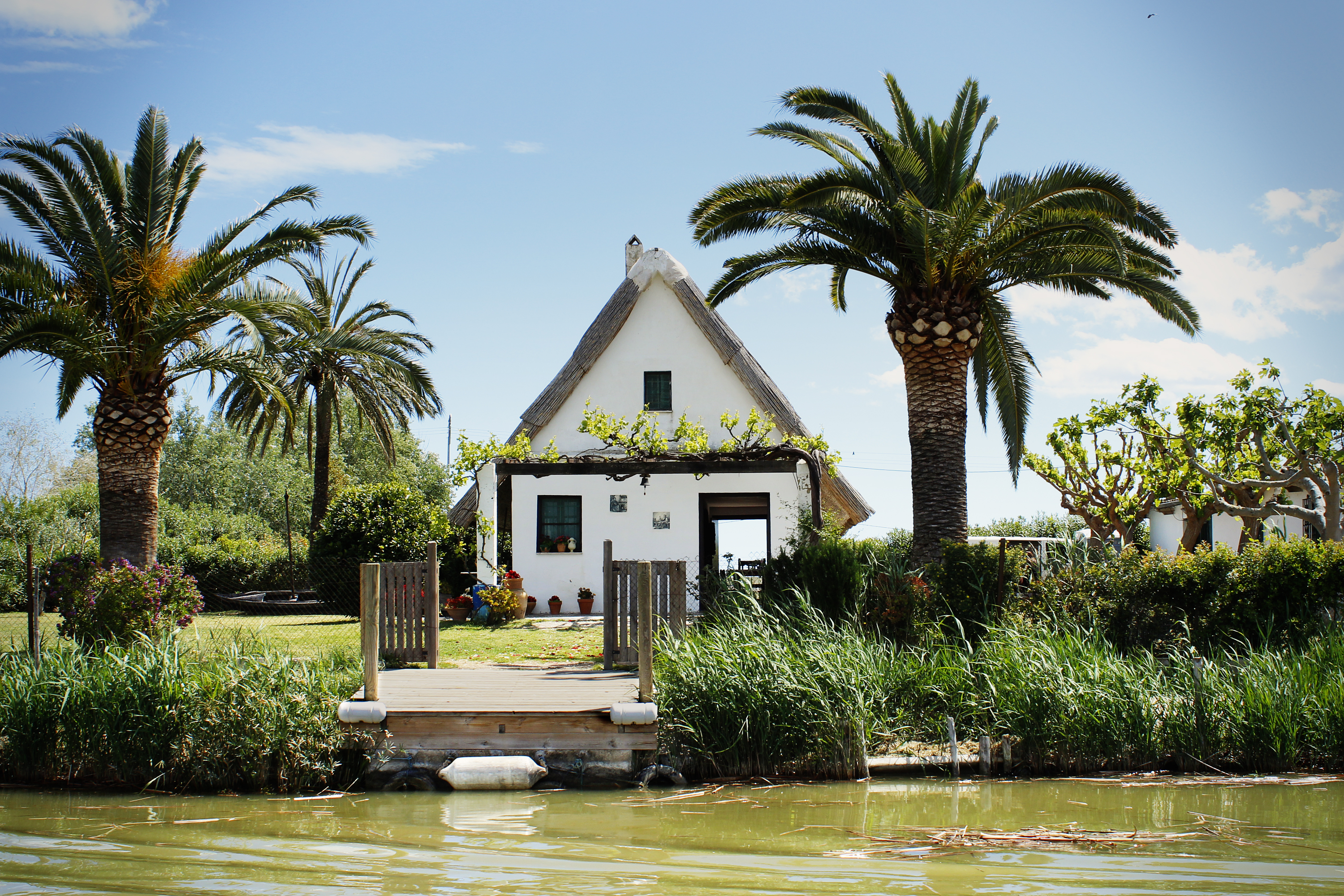
- Barraca, typical construction of the Albufera

- Location within Spain

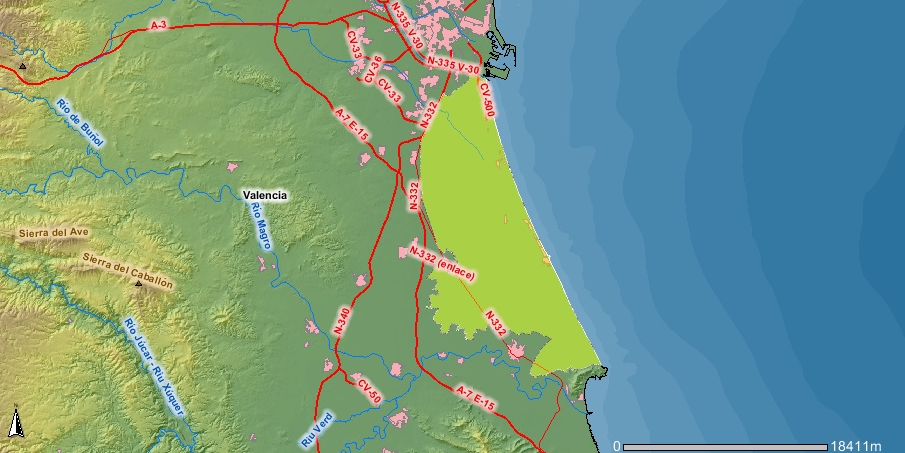
- Location in Spain
- Location: Spain
- Nearest city: Valencian Community
- Coordinates: 39.295736°N 0.333453°W
- Area: 21,120 ha
- Established: July 8, 1986
- Visitors: 30,000 (in 2007)
- Governing body: Decreto 89/1986
- Website: http://www.parquesnaturales.gva.es/va/web/pn-l-albufera
- 13 included: Albal; Albalat de la Ribera; Alfafar; Algemesí; Beniparrell; Catarroja; Cullera; Massanassa; Sedaví; Silla; Sollana; Sueca; Valencia; Natural parks SPA SAC

The Albufera Natural Park (in Valencian Parc Natural de l'Albufera) or simply La Albufera (from the Arabic البحيرة al-Buḥayra, "the lake") is a Spanish protected natural area located in the province of Valencia, Valencian Community. It was referred to by the Romans as Nacarum Stagnum, and in some Arabic poems, it is referred to as "Mirror of the Sun".

The park covers an area of 21,120 hectares, including the Albufera wetlands and the coastal zone adjacent to both, and it is located approximately 10 kilometers to the south of Valencia. On July 8, 1986, the Generalitat Valenciana designated the area a natural park.

On October 23, 1990, the Special Protection Plan document for the Natural Park was approved (subsequently overturned by the Supreme Court of Spain). Additionally, on May 16, 1995, Decree 96/1995 was approved, which in turn approved the Natural Resources Management Plan (PORN, Plan de Ordenación de los Recursos Naturales) of the Albufera Hydrographic Basin. On November 19, 2004, the Council of the Generalitat Valenciana approved Decree 259/2004, which established the Albufera Master Plan for Use and Management (PRUG, Plan Rector de Uso y Gestión).

In 1902, the Valencian writer Vicente Blasco Ibáñez published the novel Cañas y barro, which is set in the Albufera region at the beginning of the 20th century.

The Albufera of Valencia is a shallow coastal lagoon with an average depth of 1 m and situated on the Mediterranean coast to the south of the city of Valencia. It occupies an area of 23.94 km^{2} and is surrounded by 223 km^{2} of rice fields. The Albufera's hydrographic basin encompasses an area of 917.1 km^{2}, spanning from sea level to an altitude of approximately 1,000 meters above mean sea level. It is separated from the sea by a narrow sandy coastal bar, known as a restinga, which is stabilized by a pine forest, specifically the Dehesa de Saler. It serves as a migratory corridor for numerous avian species.

The Albufera is an important ecological area that supports endangered species like the fartet and the samaruc. It is also one of the few lagoons in the Valencian Community that has been preserved. The region's coastline used to have many lagoons and marshes. Some of these can still be seen, including the Marsh of Pego-Oliva, the Marsh of Jaraco, the Marsh of Rafalell and Vistabella, the Marjal del Moro in Puzol-Sagunto, and the Marsh of Almenara. (Note: From the book Sedimentation rates in L'Albufera de València, 1992.)

== Geography ==
=== Municipalities ===
The Albufera natural park is subdivided into four regions or comarcas: Ribera Alta, Ribera Baixa, Horta Sud, and the City of Valencia. These four comarcas encompass 13 municipalities, many of which contain districts within the park.

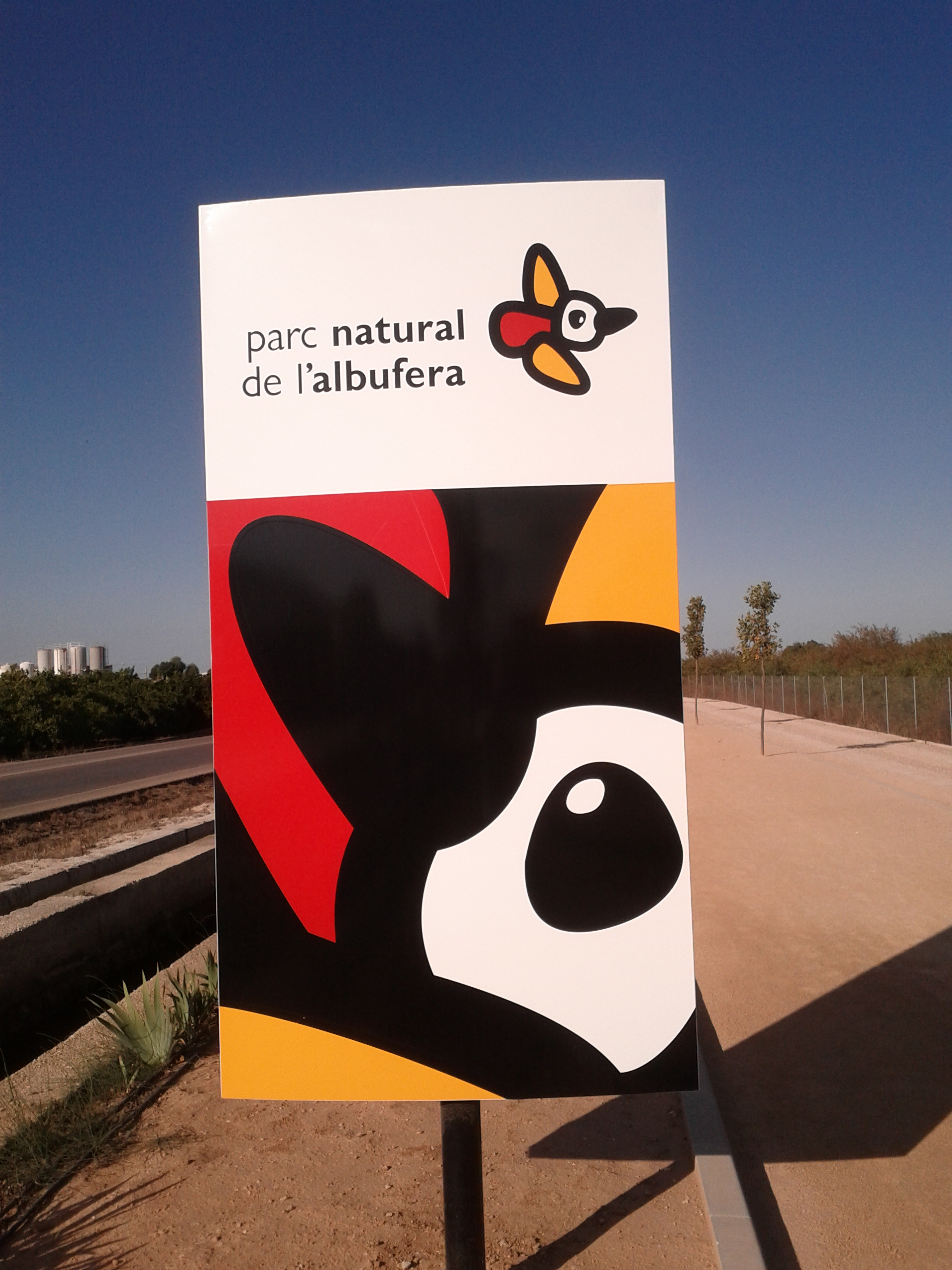
Sign indicating the location of the park.

Comarca	Municipality	District
Valencia	Valencia	Castellar-Oliveral, El Palmar, El Perellonet, Pinedo and El Saler
Horta Sud	Albal	
Horta Sud	Alfafar	El Tremolar
Horta Sud	Beniparrell	
Horta Sud	Catarroja	Puerto de Catarroja
Horta Sud	Massanassa	
Horta Sud	Sedaví	
Horta Sud	Silla	
Ribera Alta	Algemesí	
Ribera Baixa	Albalat de la Ribera	
Ribera Baixa	Cullera	Mareny de Sant Llorenç and Marenyet
Ribera Baixa	Sollana	El Romaní
Ribera Baixa	Sueca	Mareny Blau, Mareny de Barraquetes, Mareny de Vilches, Les Palmeres, El Perelló, El Pouet and Vega de Mar

=== Communication routes ===
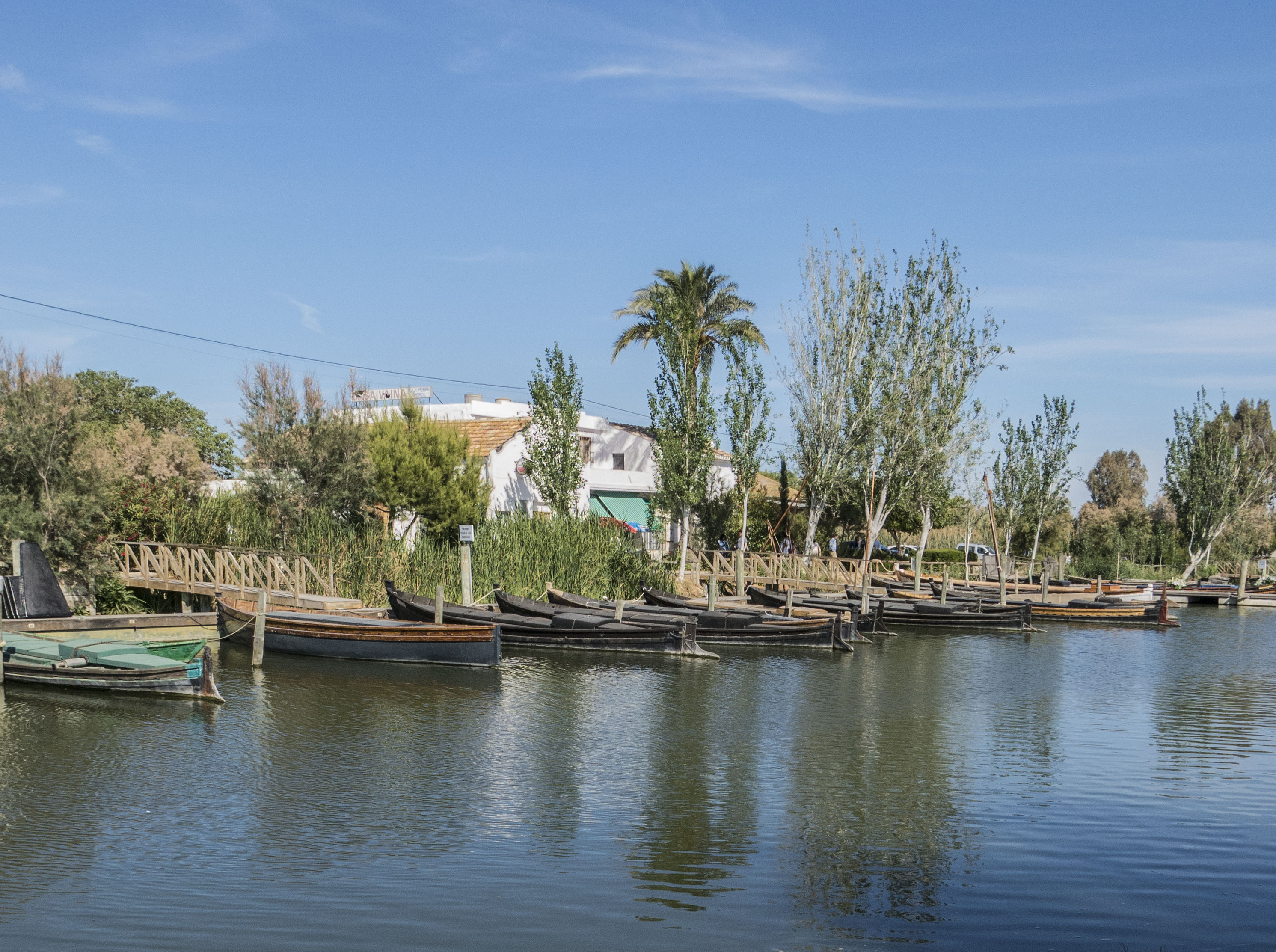
Catarroja port.

The main access road to the park is the El Saler highway (V-15), which starts in Valencia and runs north-south through the park to the Valencian town of El Saler, where it continues as a conventional road to Sueca (CV-500) and connects in Les Palmeres to the CV-502, which leads to Cullera. Another access road to the northern part of the park is the CV-401, which runs from the Alfafar industrial estate to El Saler.

The N-332 road runs southwest of the park, from Sollana to Sueca, although it is currently being converted into the Valencia-Almería motorway along the coast. Other important roads are the urban roads of Silla (V-31) and the southern ring road of Valencia (V-30), which form the artificial border of the park.

In addition to these roads, the Albufera Natural Park is also crossed by numerous rural and drovers' roads that connect the different areas of the park and the different towns in the region. There are also several river ports, such as those of Catarroja, El Tremolar, Silla and Sollana, as well as piers in El Palmar and El Saler.

=== Climate ===
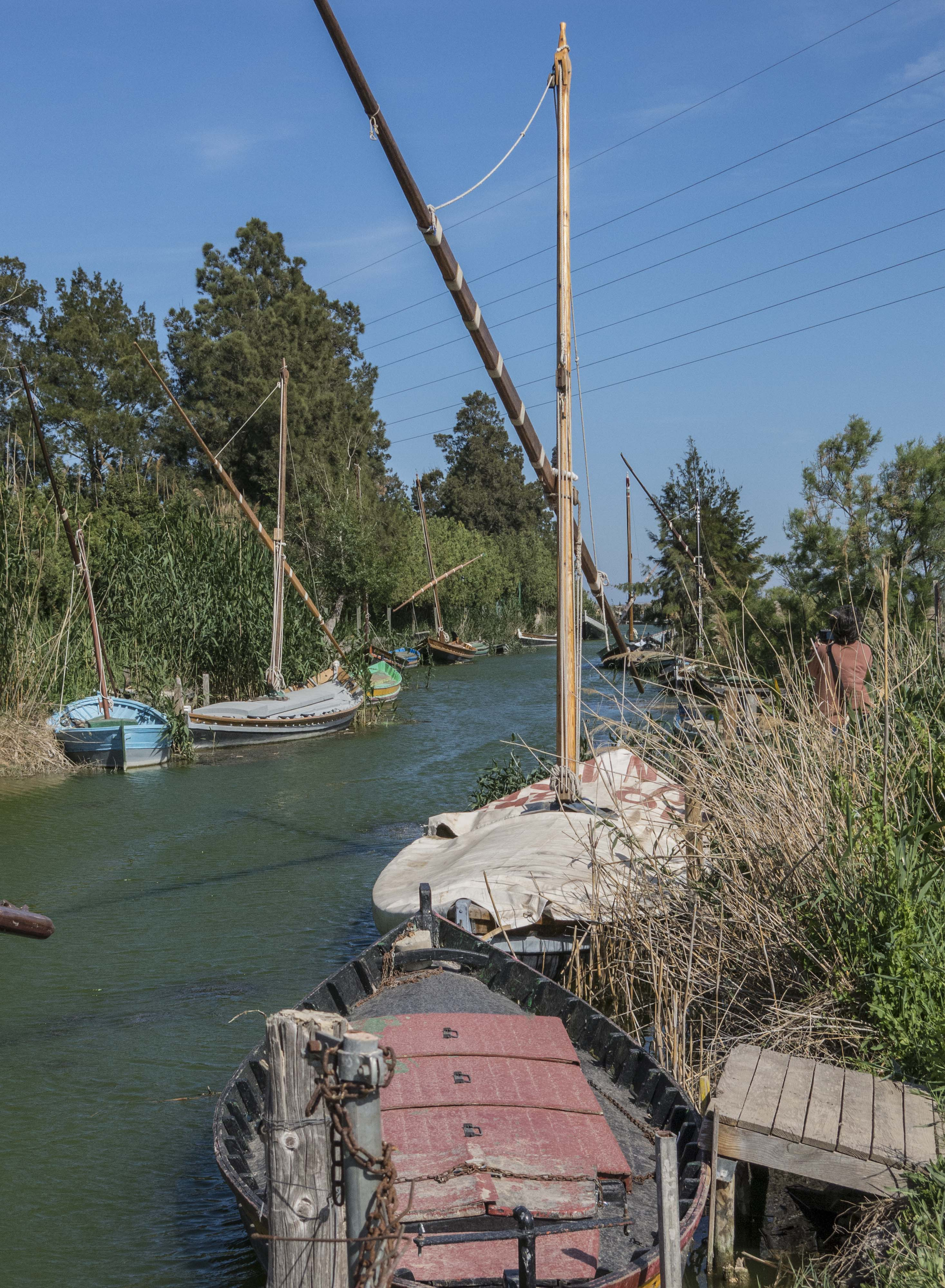
Silla port.

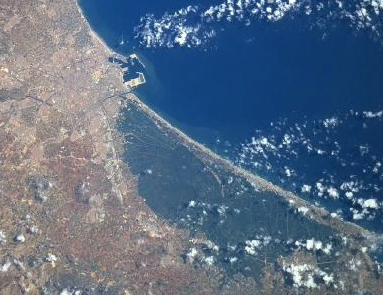
Satellite image of the Albufera.

The climate is Mediterranean, with mild temperatures and an average annual humidity of 65%. The average temperature is 17.8 °C, with a range from 11.5 °C in January to 25.5 °C in August, as illustrated in the table below.

The annual precipitation is 454 mm. Such precipitation events are typically of significant intensity and concentrated during the autumn season, a phenomenon known as the "cold drop".

(Note: The data set encompasses measurements taken between the years 1971 and 2000. These are relative values for the city of Valencia, derived from measurements taken at the city's measurement center, which is subject to the effects of the urban heat island phenomenon. The values represented here are obtained from monthly and annual averages. Some data may have been exceeded, both in terms of maximum and minimum values.The data presented here are exclusive to the aforementioned observatory. The values were derived from the mean monthly/annual number of days with precipitation exceeding or equal to 1 mm, calculated as a full day. However, the sum of the total annual number of days (365) does not correspond to the expected value, as it does not reach the minimum required for computation.)	January	February	March	April	May	June	July	August	September	October	November	December	Year
Average temperature	11.5	12.6	13.9	15.5	18.4	22.1	24.9	25.5	23.1	19.1	14.9	12.4	17.8
Maximum temperature	16.1	17.2	18.7	20.2	22.8	26.2	29.1	29.6	27.6	23.6	19.5	16.8	22.3
Minimum temperature	7.0	7.9	9.0	10.8	14.1	17.9	20.8	21.4	18.6	14.5	10.4	8.1	13.4
Rainfall	36	32	35	37	34	23	9	19	51	74	51	52	454
Humidity	63	61	61	60	65	65	66	68	67	66	65	65	65

	January	February	March	April	May	June	July	August	September	October	November	December	Year
Rainy days	4	3	4	5	5	3	1	2	4	5	4	5	44
Snowy days	0	0	0	0	0	0	0	0	0	0	0	0	0
Stormy days	0	0	1	1	2	2	2	3	3	2	1	0	18
Foggy days	1	2	1	1	1	1	0	1	1	0	1	1	10
Frosty days	0	0	0	0	0	0	0	0	0	0	0	0	0
Sunny days	9	6	7	5	5	8	13	10	7	6	7	7	91
Sunshine hours	169	169	212	229	256	271	314	285	237	201	167	150	2660

=== Hydrography ===
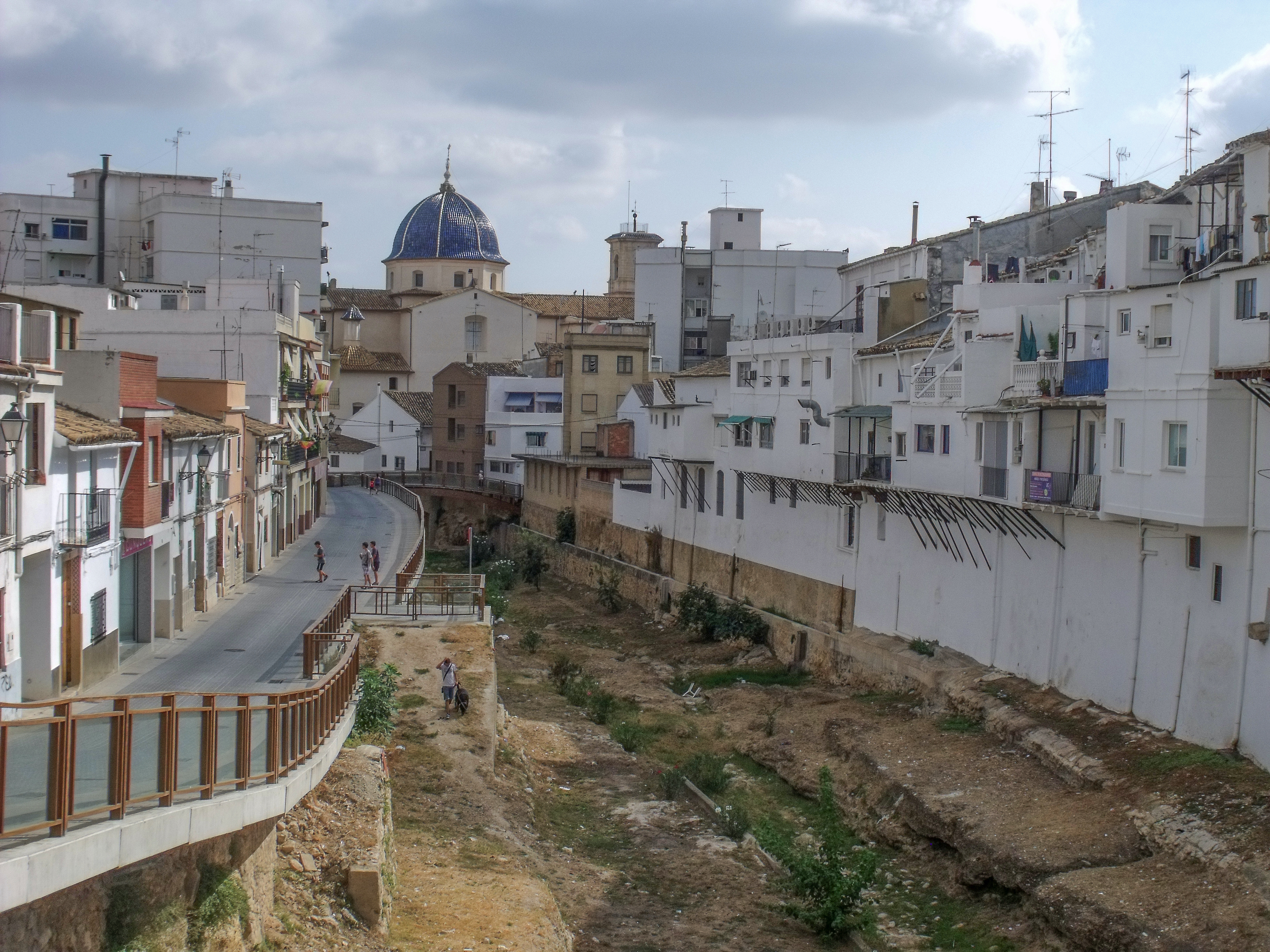
Rambla del Poyo in Chiva.

The basin discharges into the Albufera through a network of ravines or wadis. The most significant ones are: The Rambla del Poyo (also known as the Torrente ravine, the Massanassa ravine, or the Chiva ravine), with a basin area of 367.6 km^{2}, constitutes approximately 40% of the total basin area; the Barranco de Picasent (also known as the Beniparrell ravine) has a basin area of 23 km^{2}; and the Barranc dels Algadins has a basin area of 23 km^{2}, with the majority of its basin located in the municipality of Alginet, although it also traverses the municipality of Algemesí. In the municipality of Algemesí, the course of the ravine becomes indistinct, and it assumes the characteristics of an acequia, which drains into the Albufera.

The Albufera has its own hydrological basin, but it provides only a small amount of water. Most of the water comes from the Júcar and Turia rivers. In this sense, the Albufera is an integral part of the Júcar river's hydrological scheme. It also gets water from irrigation through a network of sixty-three acequias. The acequias also collect wastewater from surrounding municipalities, including El Romaní. The acequia of the Vega de Valencia receives the Turia river after Acequia Real de Moncada, using the residual flows and runoff, which is then sent to the acequia del Oro and the irrigated lands of Francos and Marjales of the Albufera of Valencia.

The network of acequias that run through the rice fields also collect water from the springs that emerge from the bottom and the surrounding areas of the lagoon. These waters are augmented by wastewater from the Pinedo, Quart-Benager, and Albufera Sur treatment plants.

==== Acequias ====
The area has had an important network of acequias and canals since Roman and Muslim times. The Acequia Real del Júcar provides water to most of the orchards and rice fields around the Albufera. Its average flow during irrigation is 15 m^{3}/s. It drains into the Albufera through different channels, including l'Alqueresia, Barranquet, La Foia, and Nova de Silla, ending in the Albal acequia.

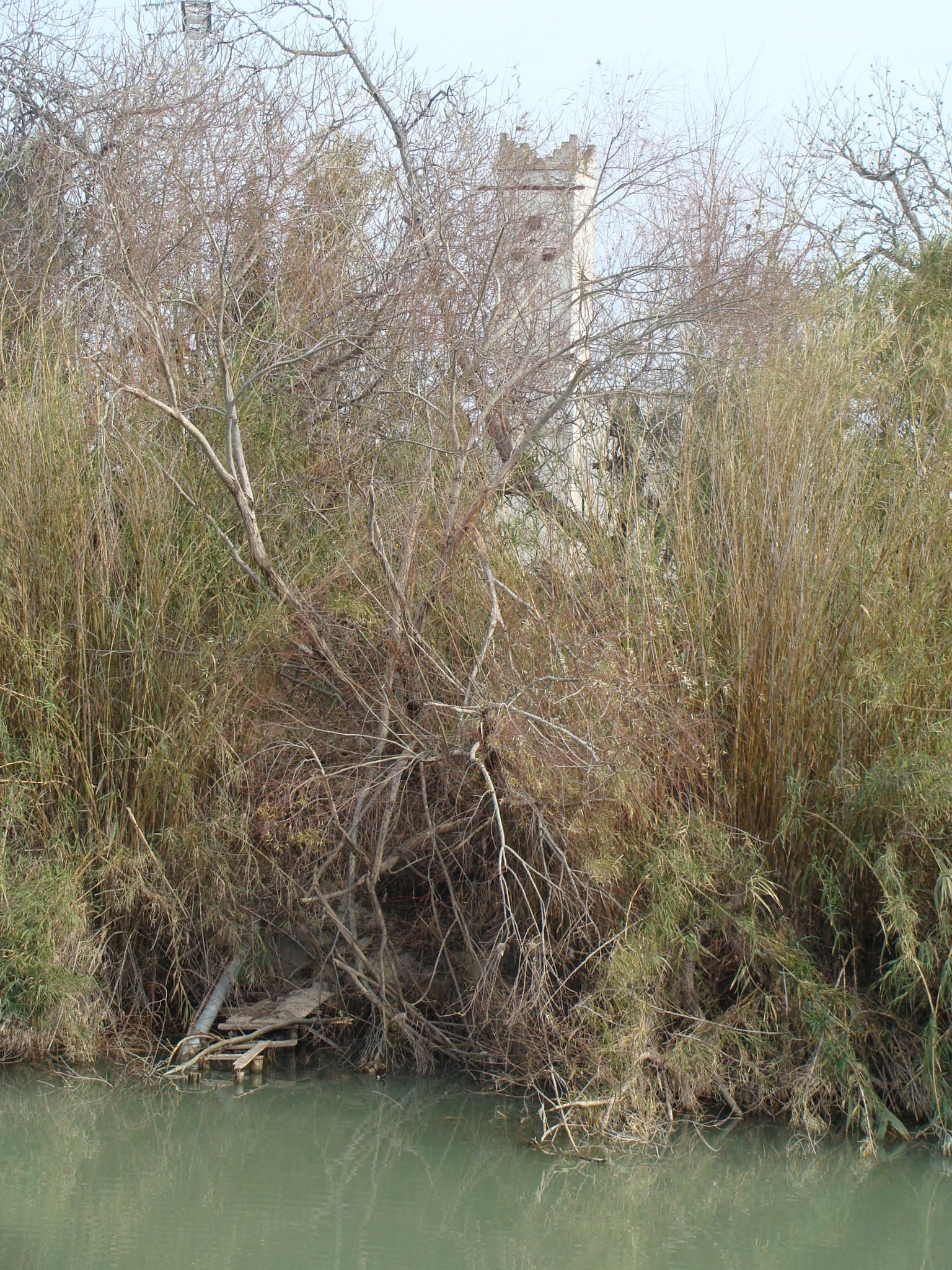
Pumping water from the Júcar to irrigate the rice fields of Sueca.

In contrast, the Sueca mother acequia provides irrigation water to rice fields in the southern Albufera region. Its average flow during irrigation periods is 13 m^{3}/s, reaching the Albufera through the Nova acequia, which ends in the Dreta acequia.

The Acequia de Favara is one of eight acequias in the Vega de Valencia (under the jurisdiction of the Water Tribunal of the plain of Valencia). It irrigates the fields on the right bank of the old Turia River. This acequia ends at the Port of Catarroja, where it joins the Acequia de Rovella and the rice fields of the northwest of the Albufera of Valencia. The Acequia del Oro is the last acequia in the Horta of Valencia. It irrigates the lands on the right bank of the Turia river between the river bed and the Mediterranean Sea. These lands are primarily rice fields in the northern part of the Albufera Natural Park. The Acequia del Oro ends its waters in the Albufera through the El Saler Port's canal and the Rabisanxo acequia.

== History ==
=== Formation ===
The formation of Albufera dates back to the beginning of the Pleistocene. It can be attributed to the closure of an ancient bay caused by the subsidence of the Valencian plain. The closure was caused by the formation of a wide headland between the rivers Júcar and Turia, between Valencia and Cullera (about 30 km). The definitive separation of the Albufera from the sea occurred during the Roman period, when the surface of the lake was approximately 30,000 hectares. However, over the years it has undergone significant clogging and shrunk to 2,800 hectares due to human activities, especially rice cultivation.

=== Antiquity ===
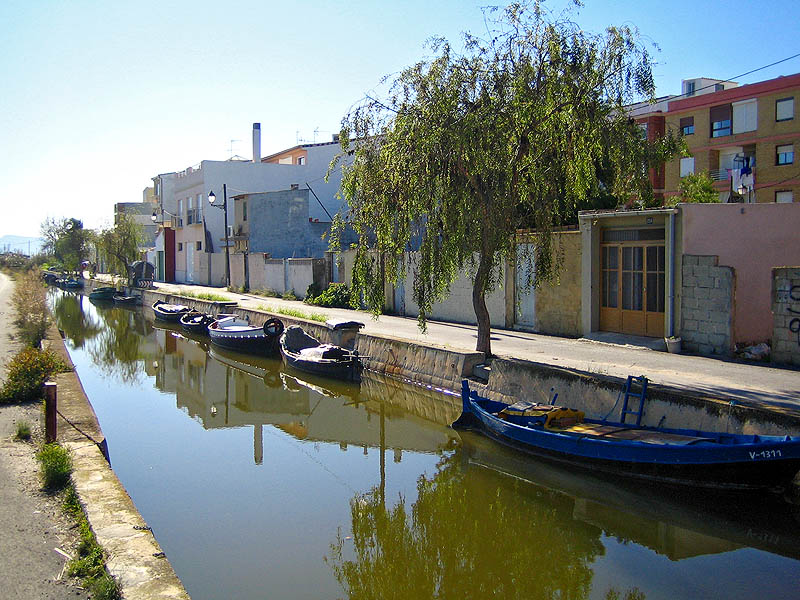
Street and canal in El Palmar.

The city of Cicana (Sueca) was named by the Iberians after the Sicano river, which is also known as the Júcar. The Turia river, which is located in close proximity to the confluence of the Sicano and Júcar rivers, encircles the city of Valencia. The land slopes away from the sea for a considerable distance, presenting a vista of uncultivated terrain. (....). The Capasia mountain range runs behind it, featuring a considerable elevation. The beaches devoid of vegetation extend to the ruins of Chersoneso. Next to them is the lake of the mother-of-pearl (the Albufera), and in the middle of it rises a small island (the Montaña de los Santos) that produces olive trees. This island is consecrated to Minerva due to the presence of olive trees.

=== Middle and Modern Age ===
During the Islamic period in the Peninsula, the Emir of Zaragoza, Mostahim, was granted the Albufera as a reward for his alliance with El Cid in the capture of Valencia.

The practice of fishing was formally recognized by the governing authorities in the year 1250, when a group of individuals from the town of Ruzafa (present-day Valencia) relocated to the island of El Palmar and established a permanent settlement there. The fishermen sought a more convenient and comfortable method of fishing. Over time, this practice was acknowledged and permitted in the towns of Silla and Catarroja. King Jaime I was so impressed by this development that he decreed that, "despite being considered external to the kingdom and beyond the city of Valencia's boundaries, they would be permitted to remain attached to the prince's estate".

In 1250, following the inclusion of Morella in the Crown's assets, a privilege was issued on January 21. This granted any individual the right to fish in the lake, provided that a fifth part was paid.

Edicts on the Albufera can be found with concessions or ratifications from virtually all the kings, including Peter I, John II, Alfonso II, Martin I, Ferdinand I, Charles I, Philip II and Philip IV, among others.

In 1671, entry into the Albufera, its boundaries, and the Dehesa was prohibited. The account of the fauna indicates that it was largely preserved. Charles III further modified the ordinances, allowing the leasing of hunting posts. Two posts, Uchana and Rinconcito, were reserved for the Captain general, while two days per year were allocated for hunting by other individuals.

=== Contemporary Age ===
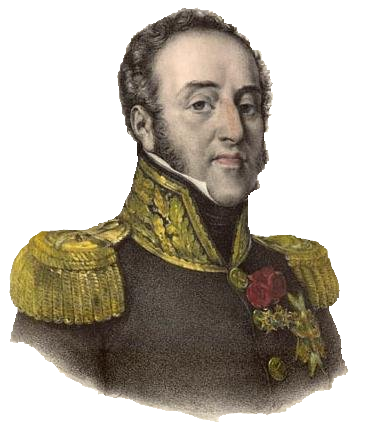
Portrait of Louis Gabriel, of the Duke of Albufera, by Delpech, 1830.

In the 19th century, evidence showed how the Albufera conditions influenced the French invaders. Joseph Bonaparte, at his own request, conferred upon Marshal Suchet the title of Duke of the Albufera. Until 1818, Suchet was the proprietor of the lake and its environs. That year marked King Ferdinand VII's restoration to the Spanish throne.

The lake began to narrow in the second third of the 9th century as a result of the practice of burying the lake, particularly for the purpose of growing rice. This process was accompanied by a gradual reduction in the fauna, with only small game remaining.

On May 12, 1865, the lake and the Dehesa were formally transferred to state ownership, marking the conclusion of over six centuries of royal tenure. In 1911, the city of Valencia acquired ownership of both the lake and the Dehesa, thus conferring upon all Valencians the status of proprietors of this natural area of considerable ecological, environmental, and landscape value. However, the final transfer of title was not completed until 1927, at a cost of 1,062,980.40 pesetas.

In the mid-20th century, a project was initiated to build the Valencia airport in the vicinity of Dehesa, and to relocate the flights that were conducted at Malvarrosa. However, due to unforeseen foundation issues, the location was ultimately relocated to the current site in Manises.

In 1962, the Valencia City Council authorized the drafting of a plan for the urbanization of the Montaña de la Dehesa. Simultaneously, the council ceded land to the Ministry of Information and Tourism for the construction of a Parador hotel and the location of a golf course. In 1967, the Saler Management Plan was approved by the municipality, thereby initiating the urbanization process. In 1971, the government granted 63 hectares to a private company for the operation of a horse racing facility.

Although there had already been reports by the Real Sociedad Española de Historia Natural (Royal Spanish Society of Natural History), which pointed out the concern for the future of the natural environment of the Albufera, it was not until the early 1970s that the first public controversies arose, with the accusations made on television by Félix Rodríguez de la Fuente. As a result, and because of the response from biologists, journalists and the nascent ecology movement, the City Council suspended the land auctions in 1973. In 1974, the City Council reduced the planned construction area by half.

During the transition period, political forces and neighborhood associations advocated for the public use of the Albufera and the Dehesa. Of the 852 hectares initially planned, only 40 were developed for road infrastructure. With the advent of democratic city councils in 1979, there was a notable shift towards a more protectionist and conservationist policy.

== Environmental and landscape units ==
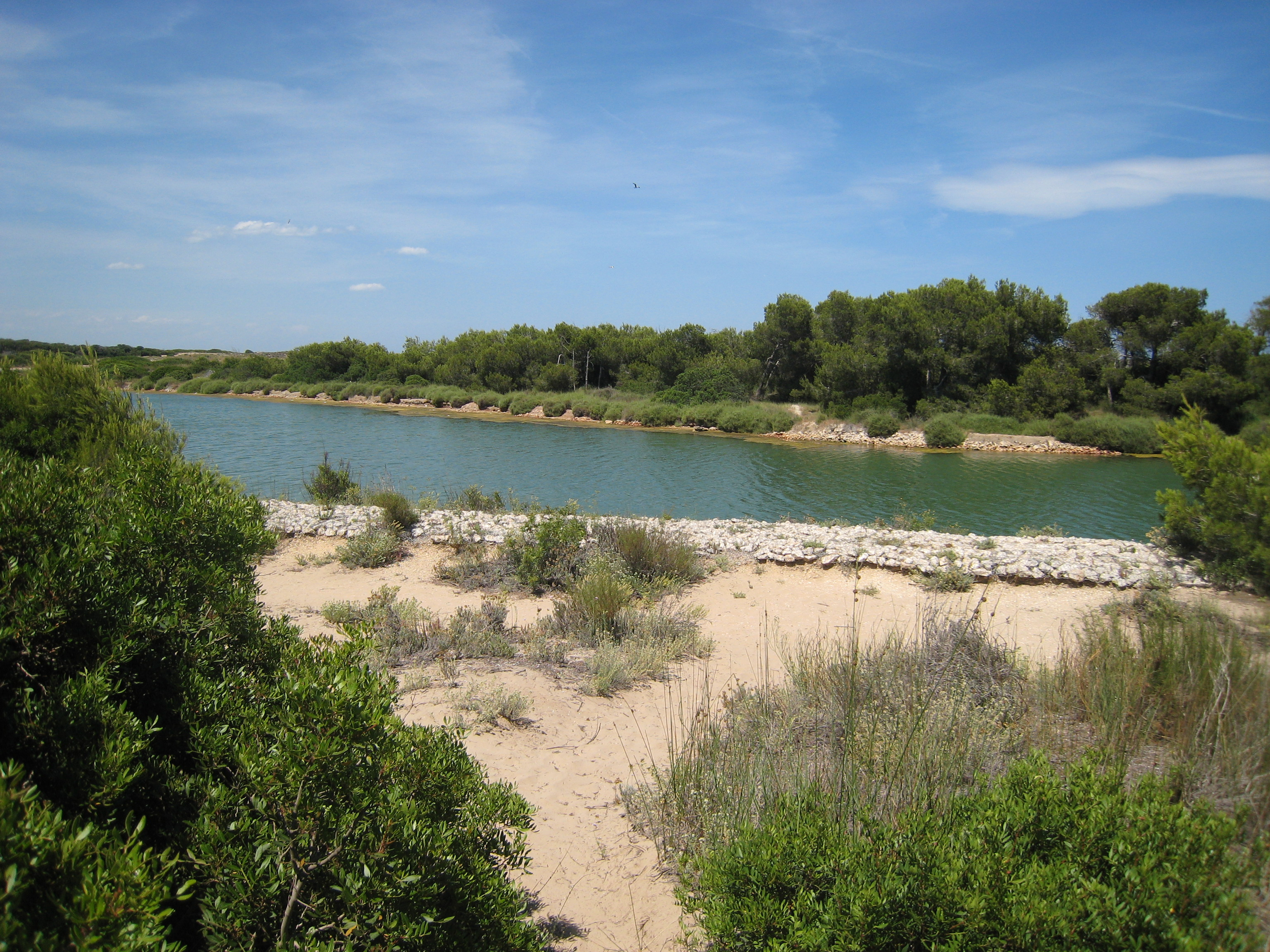
Artificial lake, Dehesa del Saler.

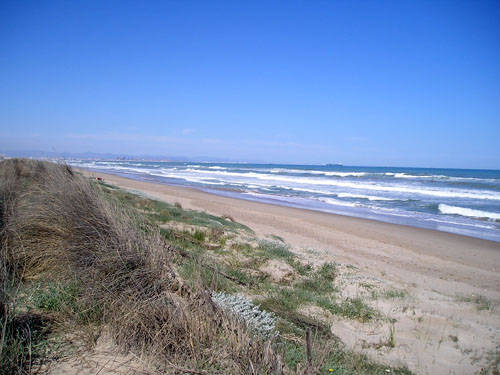
Dehesa del Saler beach.

=== Dehesa del Saler ===
The Dehesa del Saler, located in the wide area between the mouths of the rivers Turia and Júcar, is part of the primitive foreland that caused the closure of the Albufera of Valencia. It is currently one of the most interesting coastal phenomena of the Iberian Peninsula, both for its extension and for being one of the few marshy depositional environments still functional.

A significant element influencing the evolution of the coastline is the longshore drift, which predominantly follows a north–south trajectory and is sufficiently strong to transport sediments carried by rivers. Aeolian processes also contribute to the formation of dunes and the expansion of the restinga that separates the sea from the lake. The restinga has been formed in two stages. Initially, the marsh and dune field closest to the Albufera were formed, followed by the development of the maritime dune field and beaches in the subsequent period, which commenced during the Bronze Age.

The Albufera originally communicated with the sea through one or more wide mouths (gullies in Valencian), which occasionally drained the continental waters of the lake and at other times allowed brackish sea waters to flow in. Currently, the Albufera is connected to the sea through three channels: the Puchol gully, the Perellonet gully, and the Perelló gully.

==== Intradune depressions (malladas) ====
The two sets of dunes are interspersed with occasional depressions, which are distinguished by their poorly permeable soils and the proximity of the water table to the surface. The malladas and salt marshes have been subjected to anthropic degradation processes, including silting, desiccation and drainage, which have had a considerable impact on their condition. Despite this, some malladas remain in a relatively good condition, exhibiting a distinctive fauna and flora. These include the Spanish toothcarp and the Valencian samaruc.

=== Marshlands ===
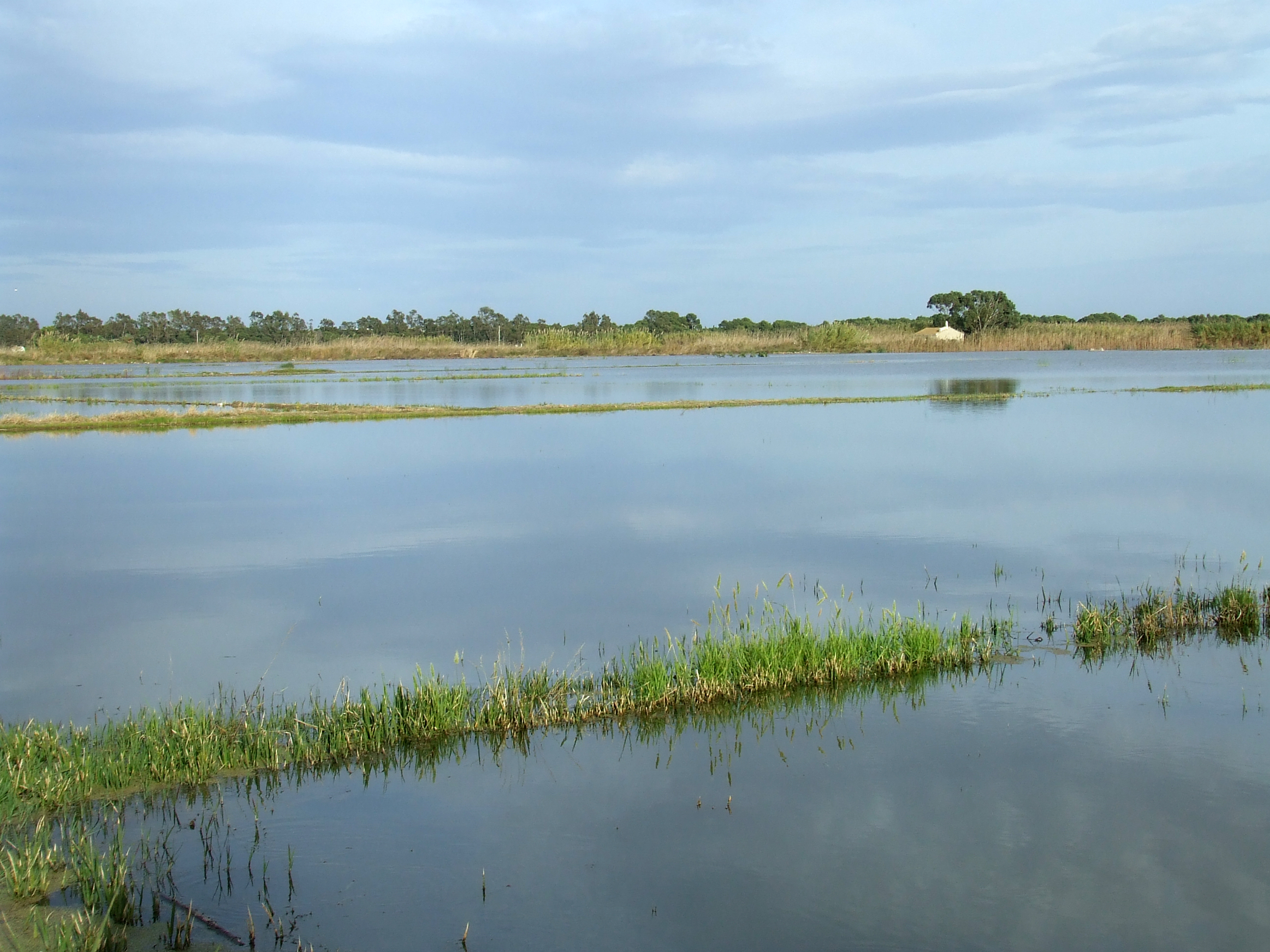
Rice fields in the marshland.

The marshlands are a former lake area that has been dedicated to rice cultivation. The 14,000 hectares of the park represent the largest area of the floodable, flat terrain within the park, forming an agricultural landscape with great historical significance in the Valencian context. Despite the anthropized nature of the environment and the intensive exploitation to which the rice fields are subject, they constitute an essential habitat for the functioning of the Albufera's ecological system and a traditional economic activity of the region's population.

The rice field introduces a clear seasonal aspect to the entire system, with alternating flooding and desiccation of the fields and plant growth. This considerably affects the size and characteristics of the flooded area. From an ecological perspective, the flooded area can be conceptualized as a temporary lagoon that floods in autumn and dries out in spring, as well as a cultivation area in summer.

==== Springs (ullals) ====
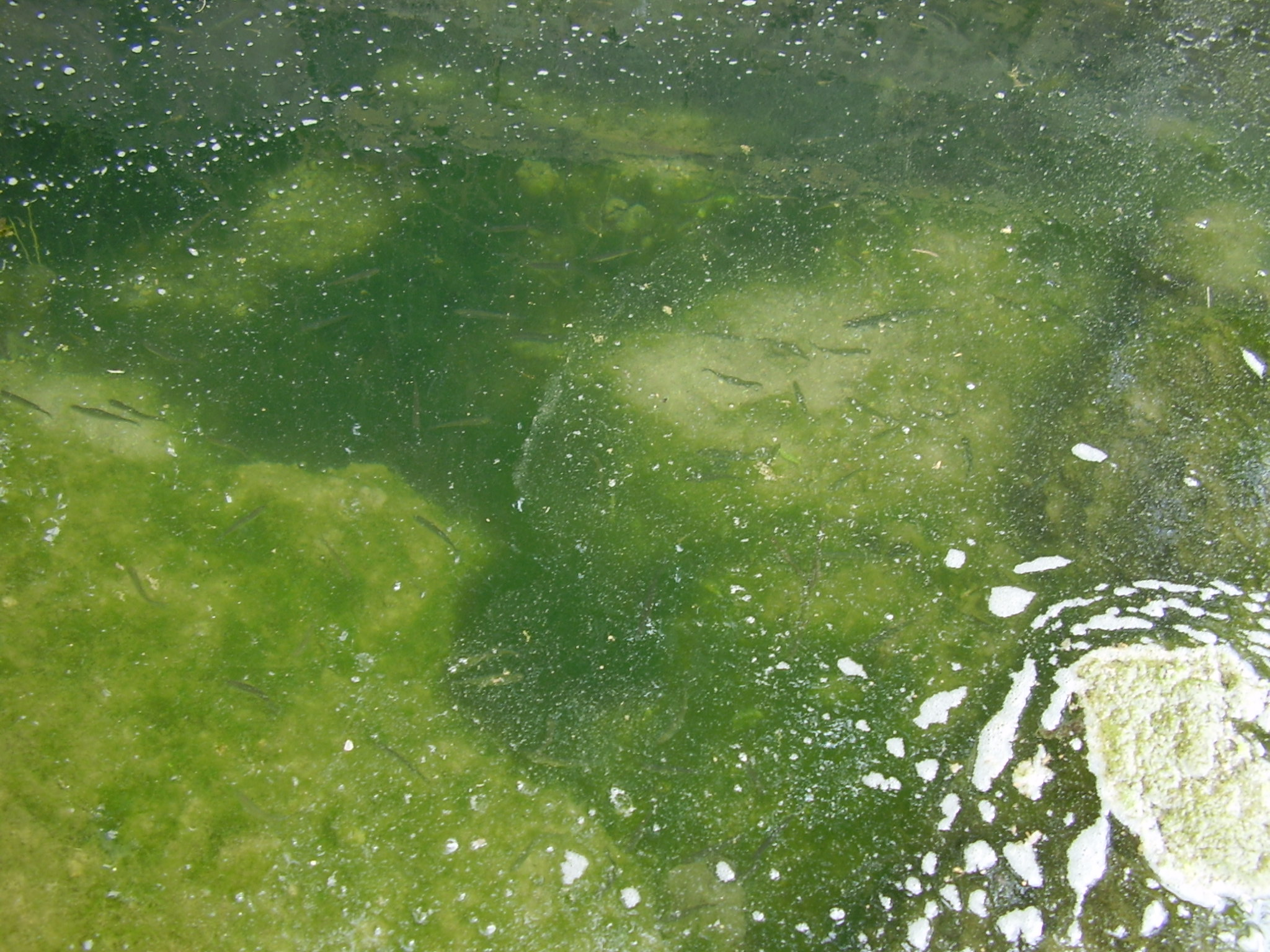
An ullal (spring).

The ullals are the springs that can be found along the marshes of the Albufera. These springs are home to native fauna such as the Spanish toothcarp and the Valencian samaruc, as well as aquatic, marsh and riverside vegetation. In this regard, the main values of the ullals are the presence of invertebrates endemic to the park, a freshwater aquatic vegetation of the most well-preserved in the peninsula, the habitat of several endangered fish and the primary source of clean water that drains into the lake.

The marsh is home to approximately 50 springs, which may be in varying states of conservation. Some springs, such as the Ullal Gros (large spring), the Ullal de Baldoví, the Laguna del Samaruc, and the Ullals de Senillera, are in a highly preserved state and host populations of endangered plant and animal species. In contrast, the springs located in the municipalities of the Horta Sud are severely degraded.

=== Lake ===
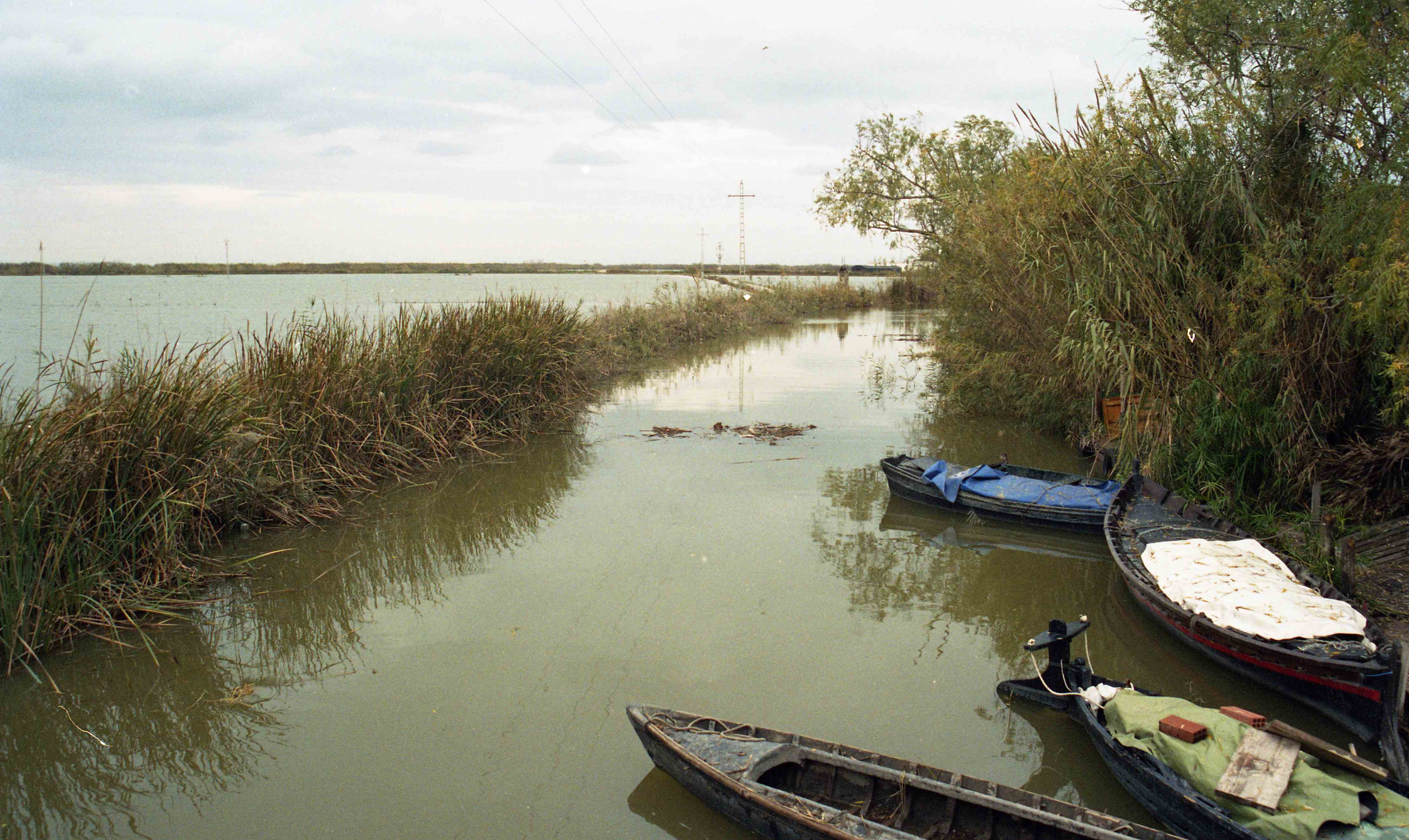
Boats on the lake.

The lake stretches about 10 kilometres from the city of Valencia to the south-east. It is the largest in the country, separated from the sea by dunes formed by the roots of a series of pine trees adapted to this situation, and a great abundance of low scrub. In the past, its clear waters made it possible to see the sea bed, making it easy to exploit by fishermen, especially in the ullals.

The tradition of sailing vessels propelled by lateen sails and perchas (elongated poles with which the boatman propelled the boat resting on the floor of the lake) or oars, with and without engines, has been maintained to the present day. The VELA LATINA is one of the oldest known forms of navigation. During the season of favourable weather, the various associations of Vela Latina, including Catarroja, El Palmar, Silla and Sollana, offer sailing exhibitions on Saturdays.

The volume of the lake has been reduced to approximately one-third of its 19th-century size, a period during which it extended as far as Valencia, known as Cruz de la Conquista, and further to Sueca, reaching a point referred to as Montanyeta dels Sants. By the beginning of the 20th century, the surface area had already diminished to 7 by 6 kilometres from the 17 by 6 kilometres of 100 years prior. Pérez Escrich's observations in 1930 recorded a circumference of 9 leagues.

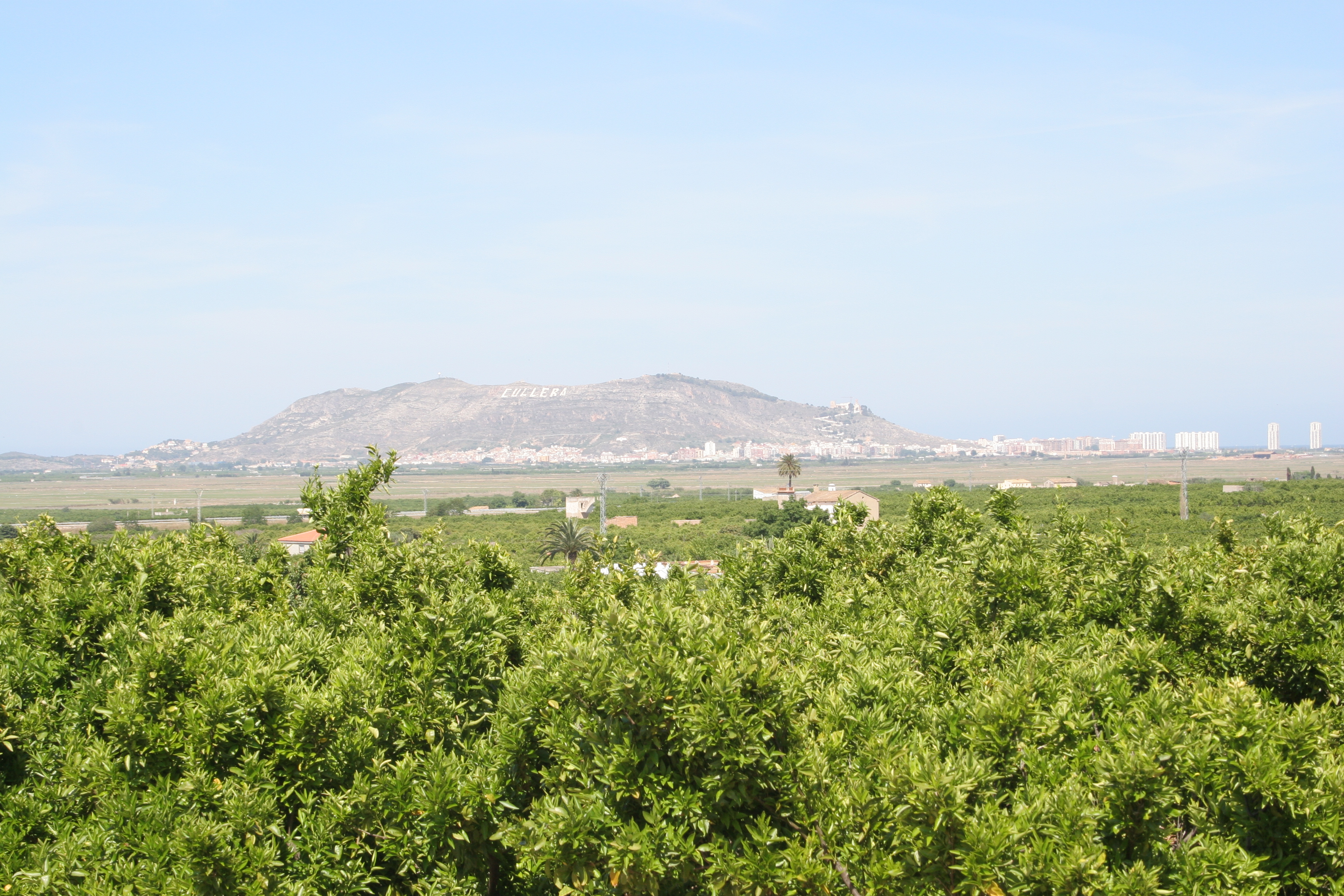
The Sierra de las Zorras, Cullera.

This facilitated efficient communication between the various towns and the capital, with regular transport services.

In 1909, Emilio Sarzo, in his book on fishing, the Albufera and metal fabrication, wrote that the depth was very uneven, with water plants very close to the surface in some places and 3 or 4 fathoms deep in others. Currently, the Albufera is experiencing silting up due to the numerous discharges from the ravines on its western side. Its average depth is less than a metre, although in some places it can reach 130 centimeters.

=== El Monte ===
Although El Monte is poorly represented, it is worth mentioning the Cretaceous reliefs in the municipalities of Cullera (El Cabezol and Montaña de los Zorros) and Sueca (Montaña de los Santos). Its main environmental value lies in its role as a scenic landmark. El Monte is an island of arboreal vegetation of singular beauty in the middle of the homogeneous plain of the marshes, standing out on the horizon from any corner of the park.

== Ecology ==
=== Vegetation ===
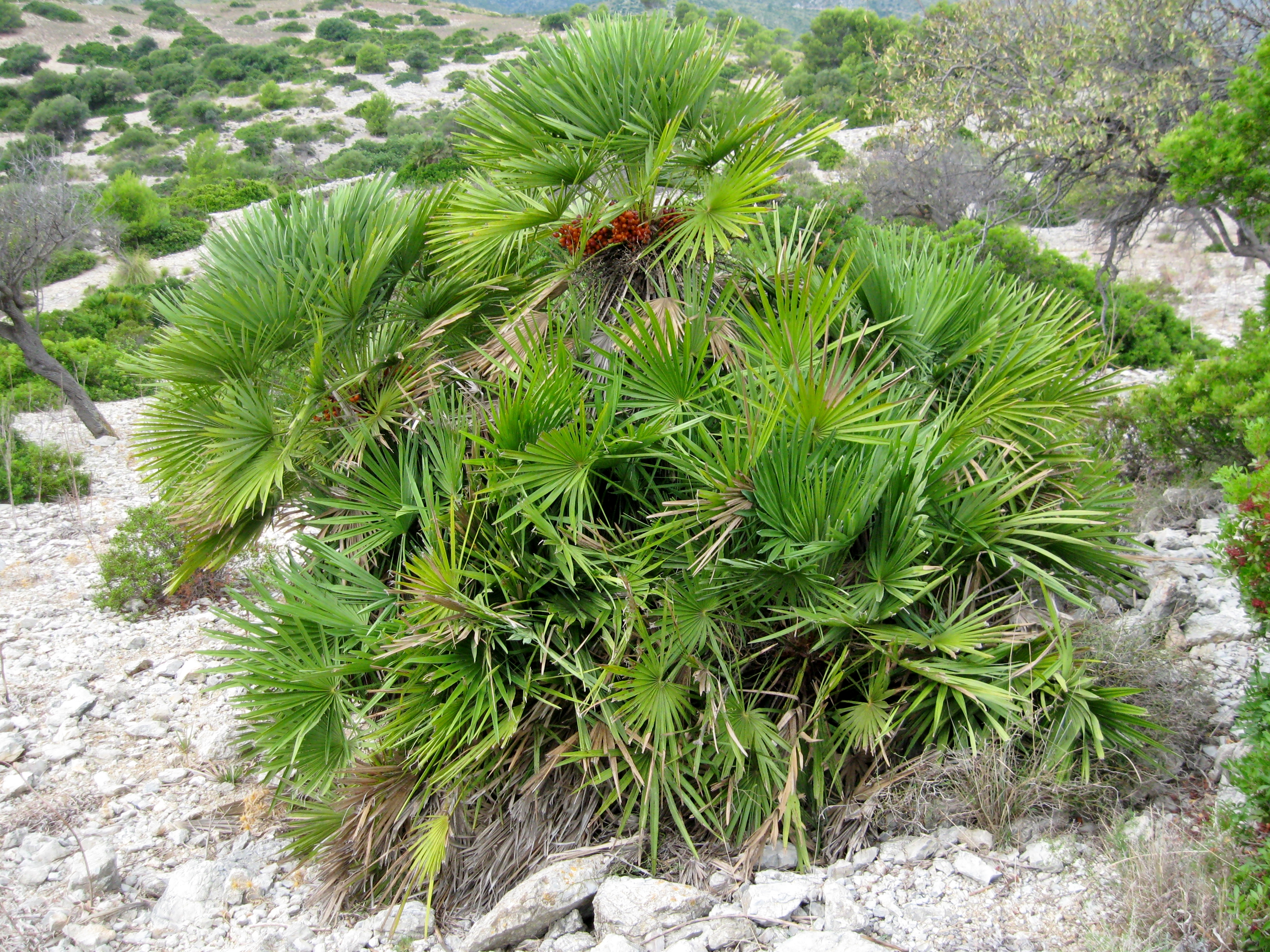
European fan palm (Chamaerops).

The plant species found in the Dehesa belong to the following communities: coastal dunes, salt marshes, maquis and Mediterranean forest, and marsh formations. The presence of pioneer species typical of mobile dunes, such as dune grass or sea bells, and fixed dunes, such as aladern or mastic, is noticeable in the coastal dunes (closer to the sea).

Salts accumulate in the malladas, so the plants that live there are adapted to the high salt concentrations, hence the name salt marshes. These are usually succulent plants, such as cordgrass and saltwort.

The Maquis and the Mediterranean forest is made up of tree and shrub species such as Baltic pine, French tamarisk, mastic, cade juniper and kermes oak, as well as myrtle, thyme, gorse, rosemary, Micromeria graeca and European fan palm.

Marsh communities have developed, always in contact with the Albufera lake and the various canals and acequias, where reeds, bulrushes, sedges and beach grasses predominate, taking root in the fresh water or in the wet mud.

=== Fauna ===
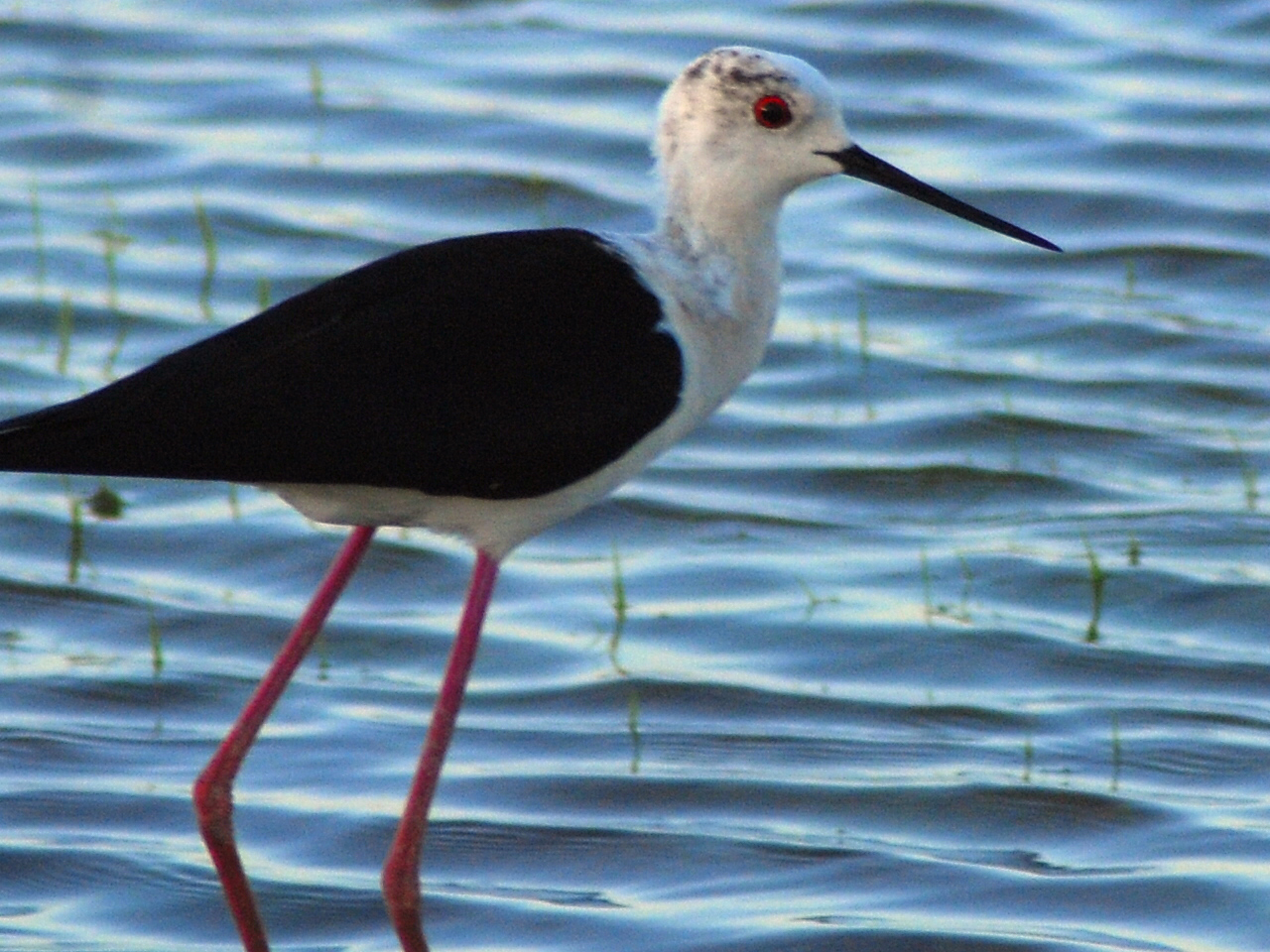
Black-winged Stilt (Himantopus himantopus).

The lake has a great variety of animals in its environment. Although some fish species stand out, such as the Spanish toothcarp and the samaruc, two endangered fish species, there is also the recent appearance of the slimy fish Blennius fluviatilis, and the eel, mullet and sea bass for their economic importance.

While the park is known for its abundance of birds, among the anatidae the red-crested pochard, with up to 10,000 specimens, the northern shoveler, with up to 20,000 specimens, and the mallard duck stand out.

Also noteworthy are the colonies of herons, being able to highlight the cattle egret, the squacco heron or the grey heron. It is also worth mentioning the presence of species such as the common tern, the sandwich tern, the common stilt, the marbled duck or the gull.

==== Samaruc reserves ====
The samaruc is a fish native to the Iberian Mediterranean coast that is in danger of extinction due to the destruction of its habitat, so a series of reserves have been created where this small fish is bred. The reserves, located in the area of the Albufera Natural Park, are distributed throughout the marshes of the park, regenerated springs.

These reserves are also trying to recover other organisms, the white water lily, the utricularia australis (a carnivorous plant), the marsilea quadrifolia, the purple loosestrife, etc. Other animal species to be recovered are the Spanish toothcarp, the cobitis paludica (mossegadoret) and the shrimp gabacha. The main reserve of the samaruc is the artificial ullal created in the municipality of Algemesí, in the Partida del Barranquet.

== Traditional activities ==
=== Hunting ===
The shooting stands are located in the flat areas known as alterons, since hunting is one of the historical activities of the area. Some chroniclers point out that it was already a royal hunting ground in the Muslim era, and later, after the Conquest, it became the property of James I and his successors.

The area between Grao de Valencia and Cullera was so rich that, according to the Valencian botanist Cavanilles and other chroniclers of different eras, there was an abundance of deer, wild boars, mountain goats, francolins, partridges, hares, rabbits, otters and up to sixty species of waterfowl, as well as an enormous quantity of fish. It was described as a "corner of paradise" in the middle of the 13th century.

Hunting outside the boundaries of the lake is relatively recent, with the precedent of the annual hunt that has been held since 1830 in the Laguna de San Lorenzo de Cullera; this hunt was held at the end of November and shooting was prohibited from September 1 to allow the number of birds in the area to recover.

Hunting is currently practiced in a "vedados" (off limits) regime in Sueca, Cullera and Silla, with eight hunts per season, on Saturdays, between the end of November and mid-January. Special mention goes to the fenced area of Sollana, whose importance was greater than that of Silla; however, there are no longer any hunts there. Traditionally, at the end of the hunts in the "vedados", the "càbiles" were held, which lasted for eight or ten consecutive days and were open to all members of the hunting societies in their respective reserves.

Hunting is currently practiced in the "vedados" (restricted areas) in Sueca, Cullera and Silla, with eight hunts per season, on Saturdays, between the end of November and mid-January. Special mention goes to the fenced area of Sollana, whose importance was greater than that of Silla; however, no hunting takes place there anymore. Traditionally, at the end of the hunts in the vedados, the càbiles were held, which lasted for eight or ten consecutive days and were open to all members of the hunting societies in their respective reserves.

The hunting structure of the park (the hunting cotos) has a rice field area of 13,259 hectares, 4201 of which correspond to the vedados.

=== Fishing ===
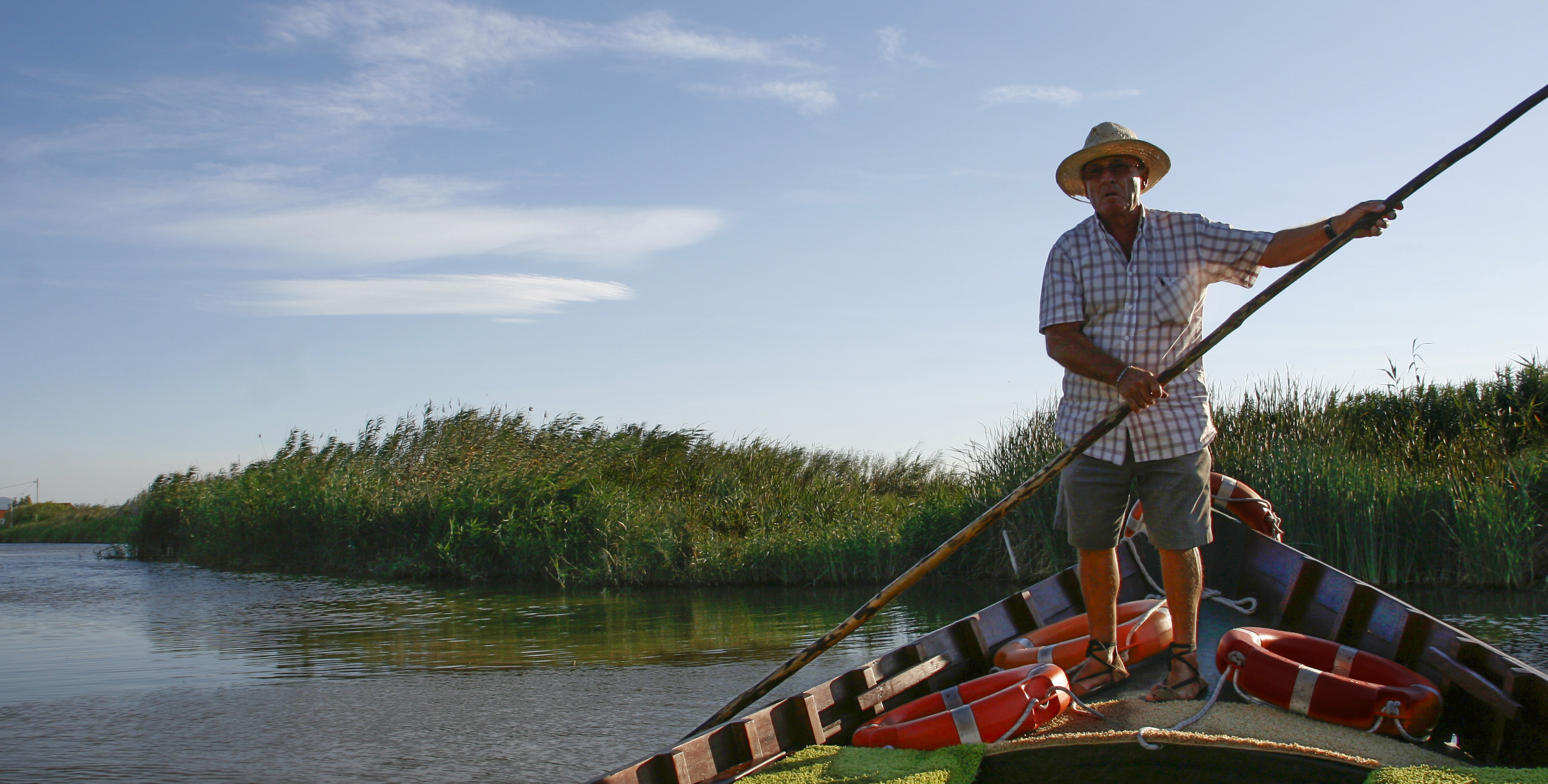
Traditional fisherman of the Albufera.

Muslims had already exploited the fish wealth of the Albufera. After the Reconquest, the different Aragonese and Spanish monarchs who owned the Albufera also took advantage of it by keeping a fifth of everything that was caught in the lake. In 1857, fishing began to be regulated in a more orderly and modern way. The first agreements were signed with the various fishing guilds in the area to ensure that taxes were paid in cash and not in kind.

Due to the over-exploitation and pollution of the waters, and the inadequate regulation of the Pujol floodgates, which prevent the natural exchange of species with the sea, only the striped bass remains in the fishery today. The other two species, eel and sea bass, are gradually disappearing.

=== Agriculture ===
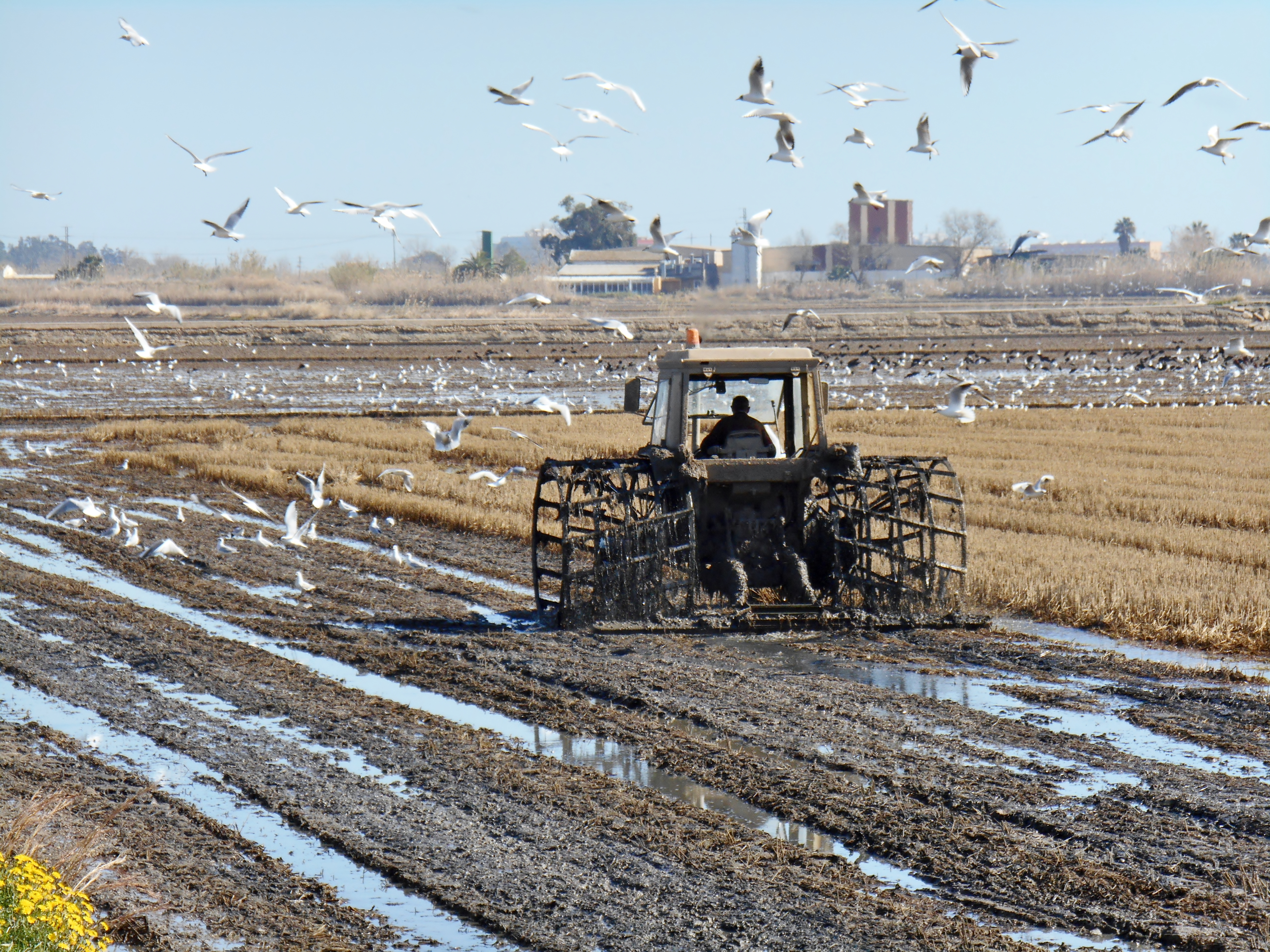
Tillage work in the rice fields in the marshlands, Sueca.

Rice is the main agricultural crop in the Albufera. The Albufera has developed along with this crop since before the time of Jaime I (when rice was introduced by the Arabs). In the Albufera, the cultivation of rice has been banned and authorized several times since the 15th century, because the need for large areas of stagnant water was a dangerous source of infection for the population.

To raise the level of the land and make it suitable for cultivation, the first step was to create a mota, or edge of land, that rose above the level of the lake and separated the plot from the rest of the lake. Then, boats (albuferencs) were used to transport the silt until the land on the plot was sufficiently elevated to make it suitable for rice cultivation.

The "redondo" or "bomba" type of rice, mainly the "bahía" variety, is the main type of rice produced in the park.

Another activity was the extraction of mud from the bottom of the lagoon, which was used for construction. The process was tedious and laborious, using a kind of hoe with a handle long enough to reach the bottom of the lagoon. This material was transported to the city through the canals that flowed inland from the lagoon.

== Environmental problems ==
The Albufera, like all wetlands, is a very sensitive area seriously affected by various problems such as water pollution, disturbance of the hydrological regime (especially in relation to the springs), siltation of the marshes, urbanization in the dune system, industrial pressure around the park (especially in the municipalities of Horta Sud and the city of Valencia), the negative impact of various infrastructures such as roads or the port of Valencia, as well as the increase in tourist and recreational pressure. As a result, the water in the Albufera has become 80% more turbid than it was a few years ago.

== See also ==
- Camino de Santiago
- Valencia
- List of Ramsar sites in Spain

== Bibliography ==
- Segura Beltrán, Francisca; Pardo Pascual, Josep; Sanjaume Saumell, Eulalia; López García, María José (1992). "Tasas de sedimentación en L'Albufera de València". Cuadernos de geografía (in Spanish). 51: 63–81. ISSN 0210-086X.
- Soria, J.M. (1997). Estudio limnológico de los ecosistemas acuáticos del Parque Natural de la Albufera de Valencia (in Spanish). Universidad de Valencia.
