= Albufera de València =

Waterbody in Spain

Coordinates: 39°19′54″N 0°21′08″W

Designations

Ramsar Wetland
- Official name: Albufera de València
- Designated: 5 December 1989
- Reference no.: 454

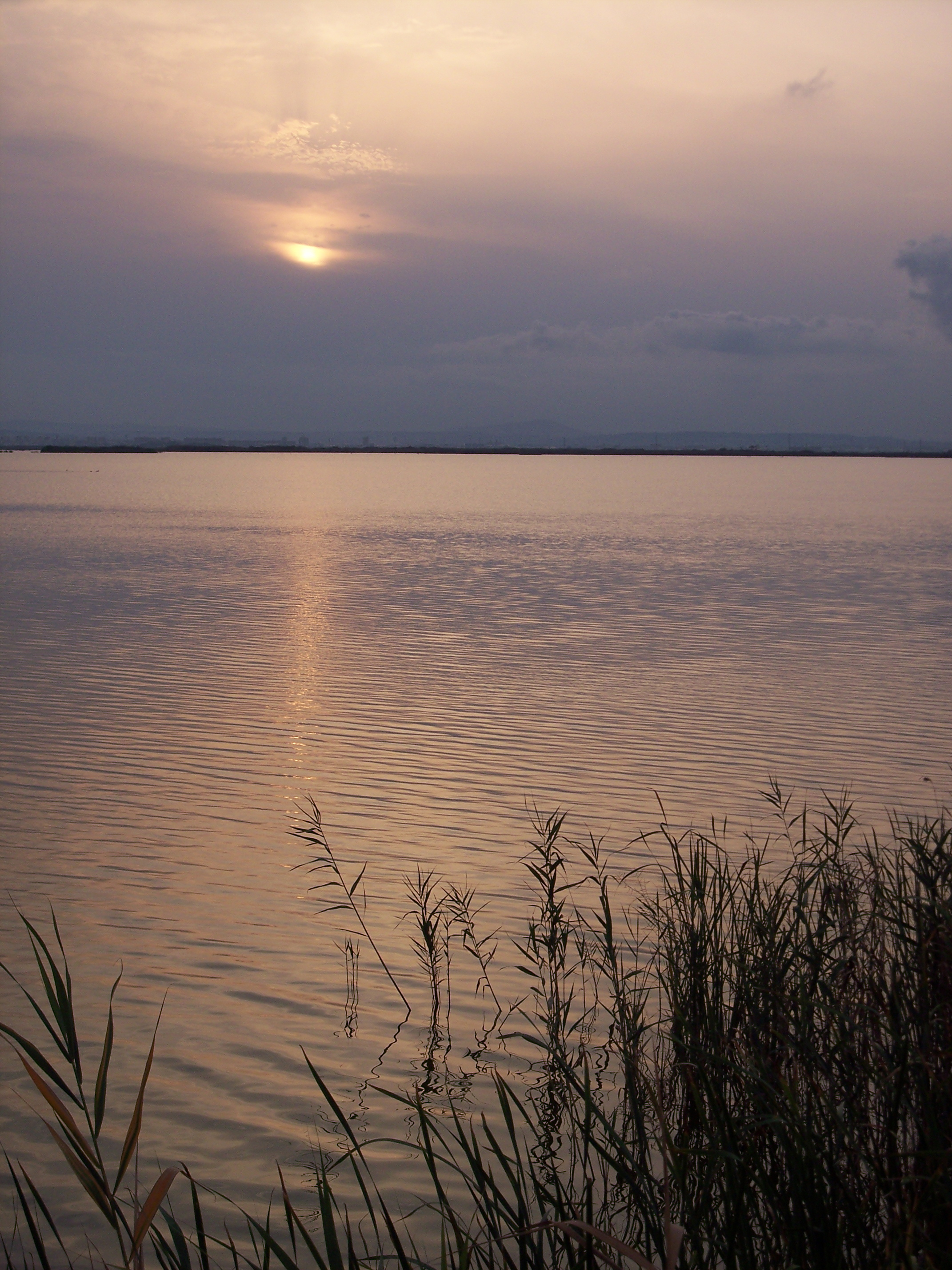
Sunrise on the Albufera lagoon.

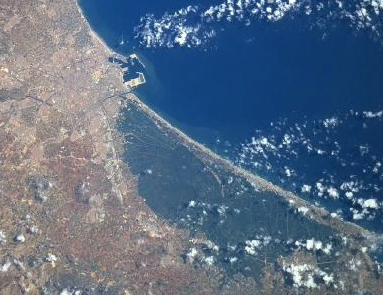
The Albufera lagoon, in a satellite image.

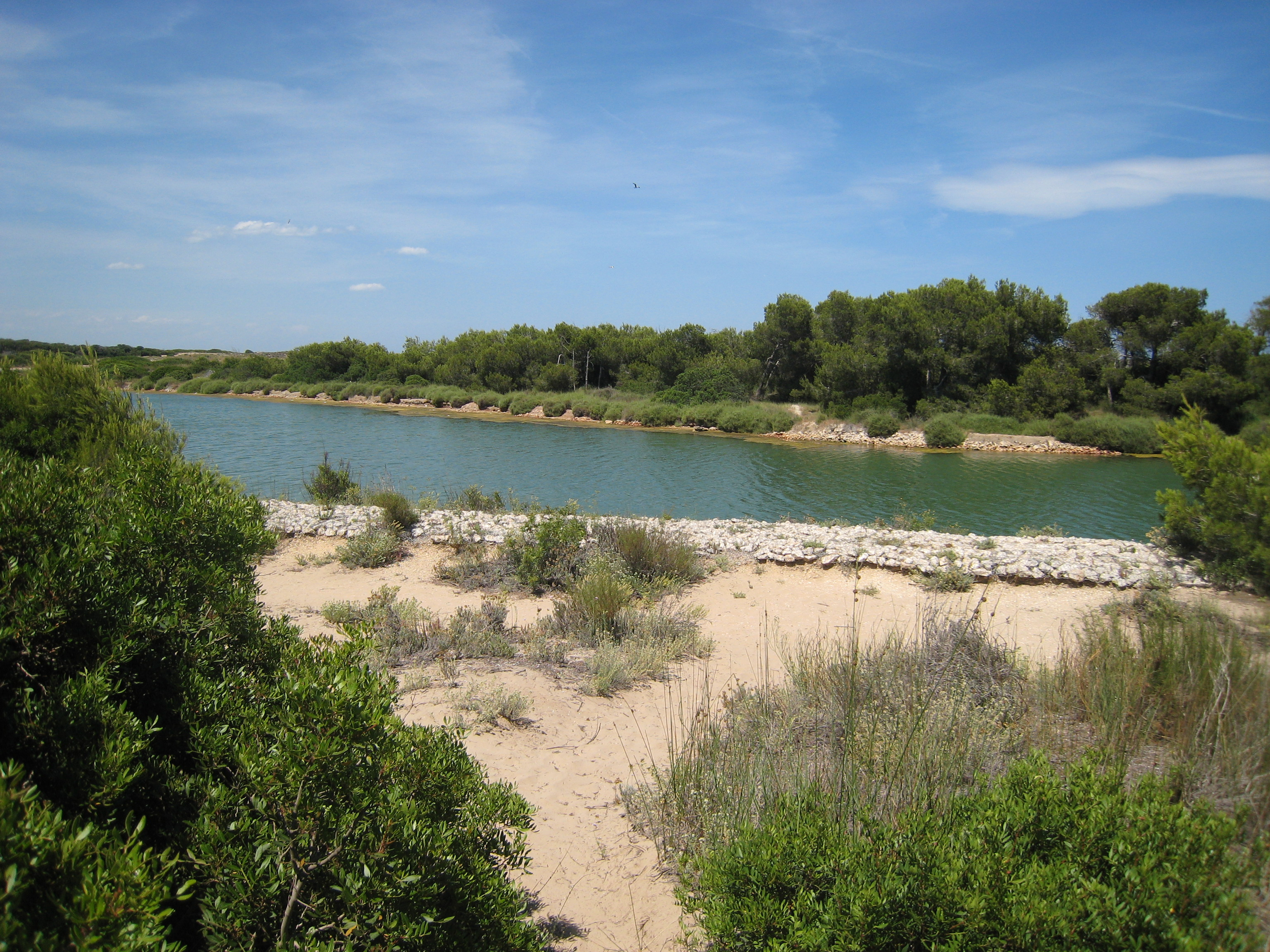
Vegetation of the Parc Natural de l'Albufera.

The Albufera de València (Valencian: [albuˈfeɾa ðe vaˈlensia]) (Note: Meaning "Lagoon of Valencia" in Valencian, from Arabic البحيرة al-buhayra, "small sea".) is a freshwater lagoon and estuary on the Gulf of Valencia coast of the Valencian Community in eastern Spain. It is the main portion of the Parc Natural de l'Albufera de València ("Valencian Albufera Natural Park"), with a surface area of 21,120 hectares (52,200 acres). The natural biodiversity of the nature reserve allows a great variety of flora and fauna to thrive and be observed year-round. Though once a saltwater lagoon, dilution due to irrigation and canals draining into the estuary and the sand bars increasing in size had converted it to freshwater by the seventeenth century.

== Geography ==
The Valencian Albufera Nature Park and lagoon lies just 11 kilometres (6.8 mi) south of Valencia, in the municipal areas of 13 towns and four pedanies (former towns) adjoined to the capital city, these in turn lying within four comarques or counties, namely, in Horta Sud: Albal, Alfafar, Beniparrell, Catarroja, Massanassa, Sedaví and Silla; in Ribera Baixa: Albalat de la Ribera, Cullera, Sollana, Sueca and El Mareny de Barraquetes; in Ribera Alta: Algemesí; and in the County of Valencia and greater metropolitan area of València, in the pedanies of Pinedo, El Palmar, El Saler and El Perellonet. Its proximity to the capital city of the Valencian Land and easy access facilitate nature experiences and birdwatching.

Since 1990, the Valencian Albufera Nature Reserve has been included as a Ramsar Site in the list of wetlands of international importance for birds, established in the Ramsar Convention of 1971. Since 1991 the Parc Natural de l'Albufera de València has also been included in the Special Protection Areas (Zepa in Spanish).

== Fishing ==
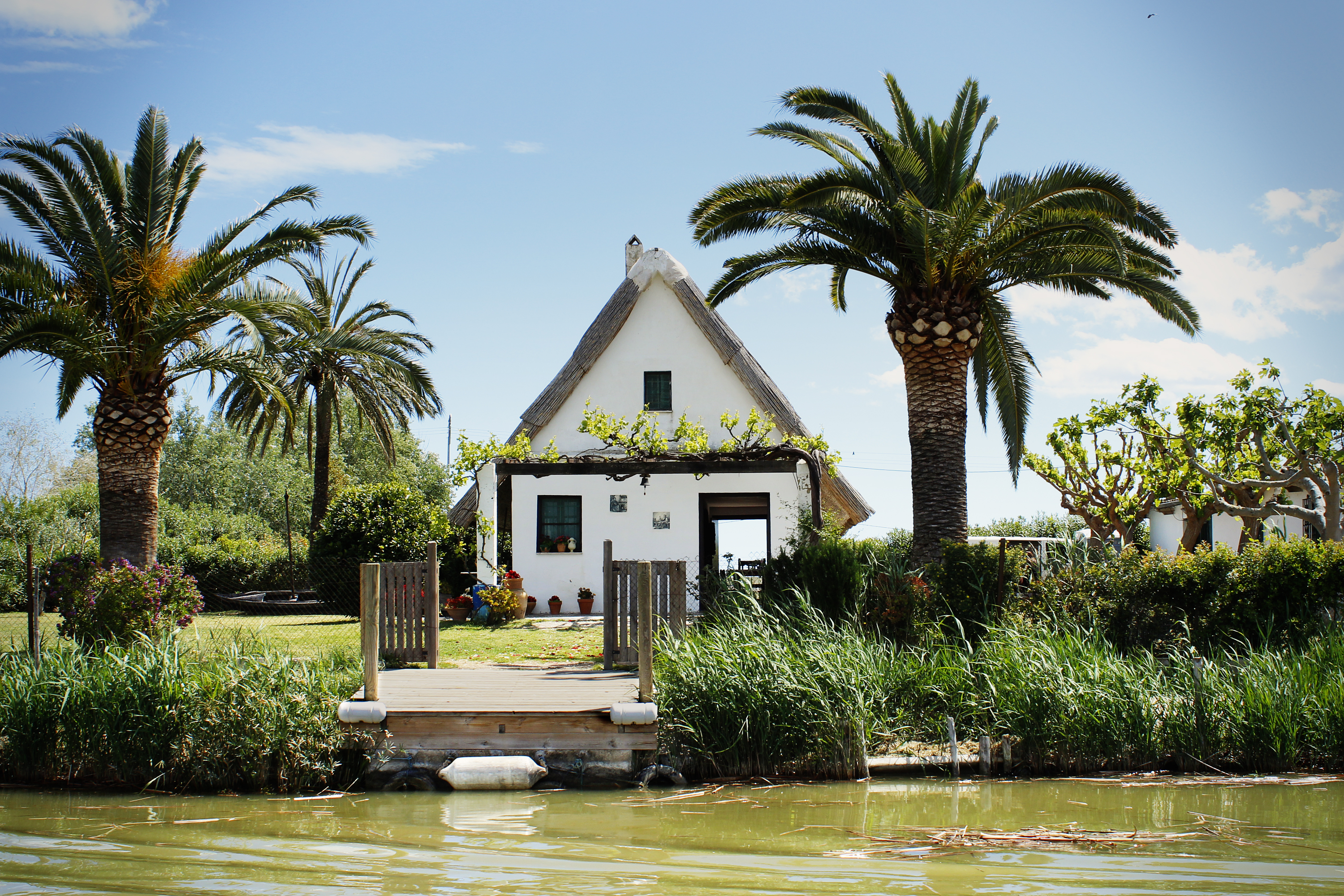
Traditional fisherman's house

The most important human use of the lagoon has traditionally been and continues to be fishing.

=== History ===
From prehistoric times the rich fishing has attracted people specializing in this activity there. Fishing was legally recognised in year 1250, when regulations were laid down for the El Palmar Fishing Association (residents of the Valencia extramural parish of Russafa who settled permanently on the island of El Palmar to work more conveniently) and which would then be applied to the fisheries of Silla and Catarroja.

=== Present day ===
Until the lagoon's catchment area started to become industrialised, fishing generated substantial profits, as the clean waters of the lake provided a great diversity and abundance of fish ("gambeta", "petxinot", eels, bass, etc.).

At present, catches of bass and eels have dropped considerably, while those of mullet and American blue crab (a species introduced in the 1980s) have increased.

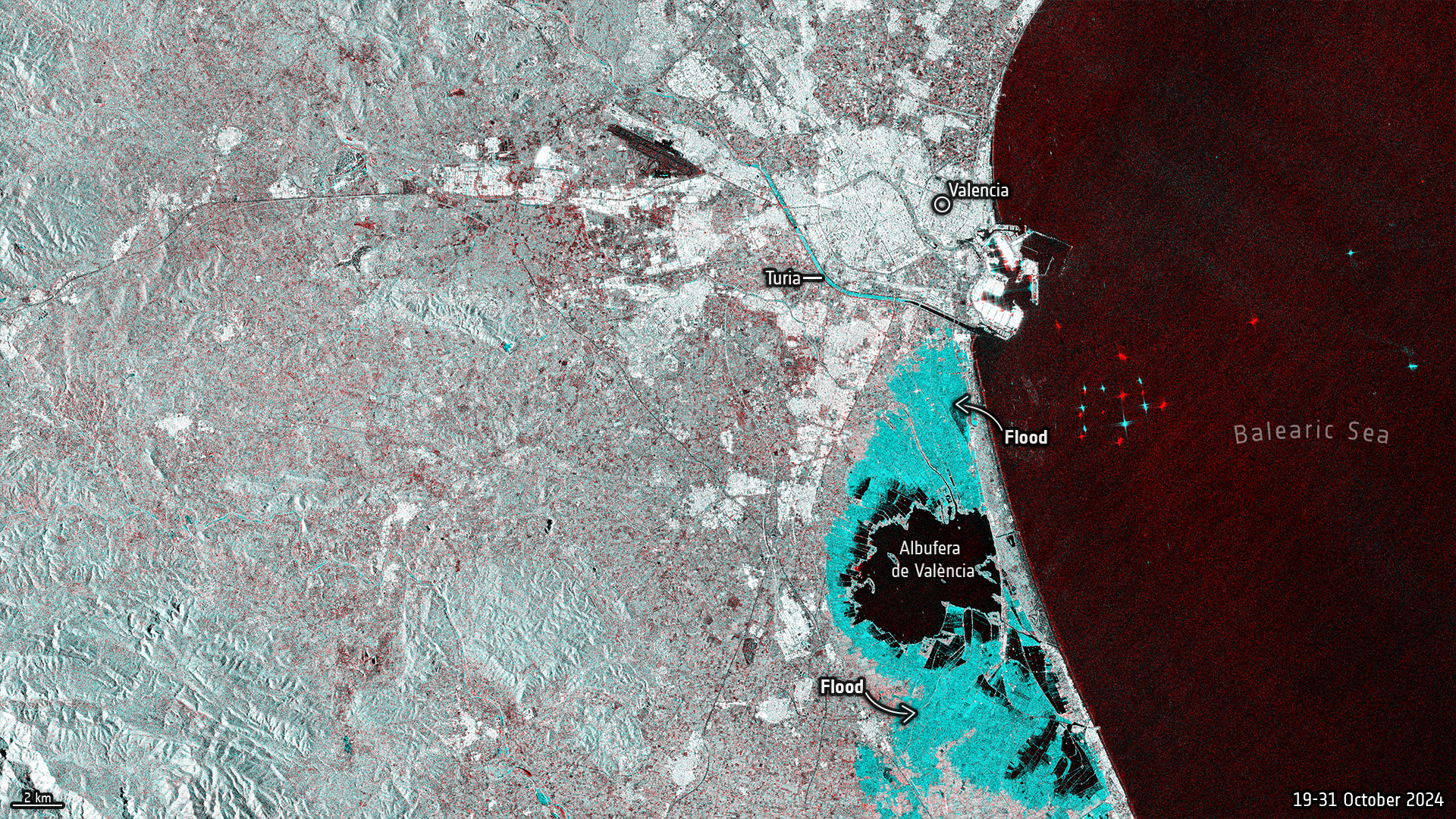
A satellite view of Valencia and Albufera on 31 October 2024. The flooded areas are marked in cyan. Albufera appears in dark blue.

During the 2024 October floods in the province of Valencia, the lagoon received water both from the Rambla del Poyo on the north and the paddies flooded by the Magro on the south. This water carried canes, mud, the upper layer of crop fields and garbage, including industrial material, plastic, fuel, and sewage.

== Agriculture ==
Rice growing is another traditional use, though more recent (since the 18th century); it has big economic and environmental importance because plant and animal species that have disappeared from the lake itself still live in the rice fields (where the water of the lagoon is purified). These rice paddies also provide food and shelter for many birds.

Nevertheless, nowadays the amount of water that arrives to the lagoon is less than some years ago, and the quality of the water is worse. It needs a better management of its water, so it can be a good environment for the fish and plants that used to live there.

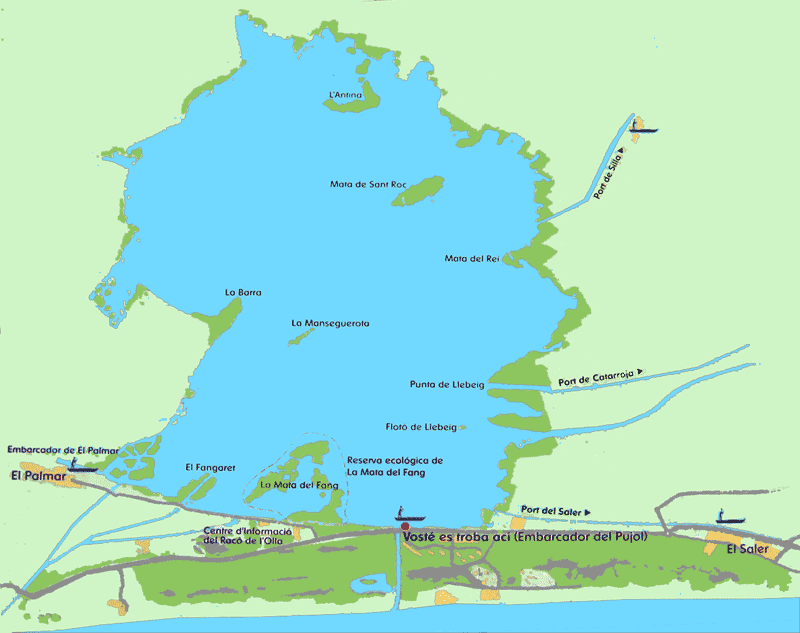
Map: Albufera de València

== Microbes of the Albufera ==
L'Albufera is heavily dominated by Cyanobacteria, particularly Synechococcus. The natural microbial population of Albufera has been recently described.

== See also ==
- Albufera (lagoon)
- Index: Special Protection Areas of Spain
- List of Ramsar sites in Spain
- Albufera Natural Park
