= Carles Marco =

Carles Marco may refer to:

- Carles Marco (basketball) (born 1974), retired Spanish basketball player
- Carles Marco (footballer) (born 2000), Spanish footballer
