= Albufera (lagoon) =

Albufera (Catalan/Valencian, 'lagoon') is the name of several estuarine lagoons in Spain:

- Albufera de València, on the Gulf of Valencia
  - Albufera Natural Park, Natural Park in Valencia
- Albufera de Gaianes, in Gaianes (province of Alicante)
- S'Albufera de Mallorca, on the island of Mallorca
- S'Albufereta, also on Mallorca
- S'Albufera des Grau, on Menorca

== See also ==
- Albufeira, a city in Portugal
