= Carles Marco (footballer) =

Spanish footballer (born 2000)

Personal information
- Full name: Carles Marco Soler
- Date of birth: 5 April 2000 (age 26)
- Place of birth: El Palmar, Spain
- Height: 1.81 m (5 ft 11 in)
- Position: Right back

Team information
- Current team: Alzira

Youth career
- Sedaví
- 2014–2019: Valencia
- 2019: Burgos

Senior career*
Years	Team	Apps	(Gls)
2019–2020	Alzira	23	(1)
2020–2021	Mirandés B	25	(0)
2020–2021	Mirandés	1	(0)
2021–2023	Elche B	59	(2)
2023–2024	Atlético Saguntino	32	(1)
2024–2025	Laredo	23	(0)
2025–	Alzira	10	(0)
- * Club domestic league appearances and goals as of 9 November 2025

Carles Marco Soler (born 5 April 2000) is a Spanish footballer who plays for Tercera Federación club Alzira. Mainly a right back, he can also play as a right winger.

== Club career ==
Marco was born in El Palmar, Valencian Community, and joined Valencia CF's youth setup in 2014, from Sedaví CF. In August 2019, after a short period at Burgos CF, he signed for Tercera División side UD Alzira.

Marco made his senior debut on 25 August 2019, starting and scoring the opener in a 2–0 home win against CD Roda. On 7 August of the following year, after being a regular starter, he moved to CD Mirandés and was assigned to the reserves also in the fourth division.

Marco made his professional debut on 1 November 2020, coming on as a second-half substitute for Sergio Moreno in a 0–1 away loss against CD Leganés in the Segunda División championship. The following 24 August, he moved to another reserve team, Elche CF Ilicitano in Tercera División RFEF.
