= Rambla del Poyo =

River in Valencia, Spain

Coordinates: 39.3786°N 0.3564°W

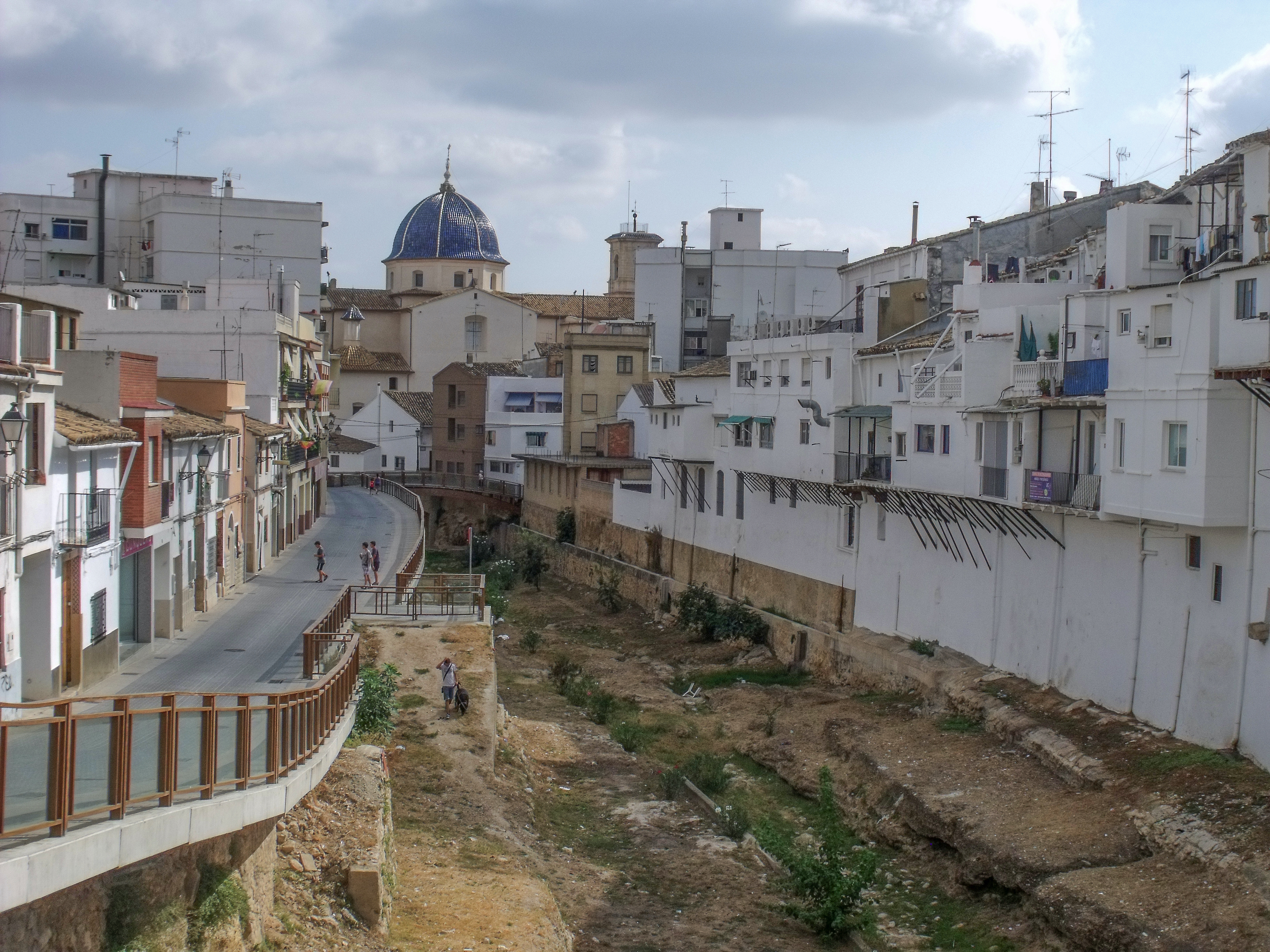
Rambla del Poyo at Chiva in August 2013

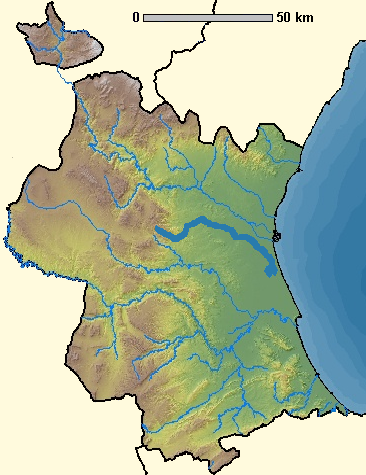
Location map of Rambla del Poyo

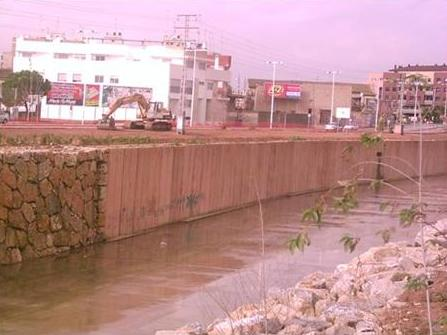
A channeled section of the Rambla

The Rambla del Poyo is a 43.5 km Rambla (gorge) in the Province of Valencia, Spain.

== Hydrology ==
It lies between the Turia and Júcar rivers, with its source in the mountains of the Parque Natural del Turia, and the mouth at the Albufera de Valencia by the Mediterranean Sea.

The Rambla del Poyo is the result of the union of the Rambla de Cheste and the Barranco de la Horteta at Torrent, Valencia.
In turn, the Rambla de Cheste is formed at Cheste by the union of the Barranco Grande, Barranco de la Cueva Morica and Barranco de Chiva, that flows through the municipality of Chiva .
The Barranco de la Horteta originates southeast of the municipality of Godelleta and receives water from the Barranco de Cabezas and Barranco de Cortichelles, as well as from the southern slope of the Perenchiza mountain range.

After its formation at Torrent, Valencia, the course of the Rambla del Poyo then continues in a SE direction towards the Albufera lake. But first it flows through and collects the precipitation from the municipalities of Picanya, Paiporta, Massanassa and Catarroja, to finally flow into the Albufera de Valencia.

== October 2024 floods ==
While the Rambla del Poyo contains a limited amount or no water for much of the year, on 29 October 2024 an unprecedented amount of water flowed through the gorge as a result of extremely heavy rainfall. At its peak, more than 2 million liter per second was registered. This caused extensive damage and dozens of deaths in the municipalities along its course.
