= Pinedo (Valencia) =

Coordinates: 39.419°N 0.337°W

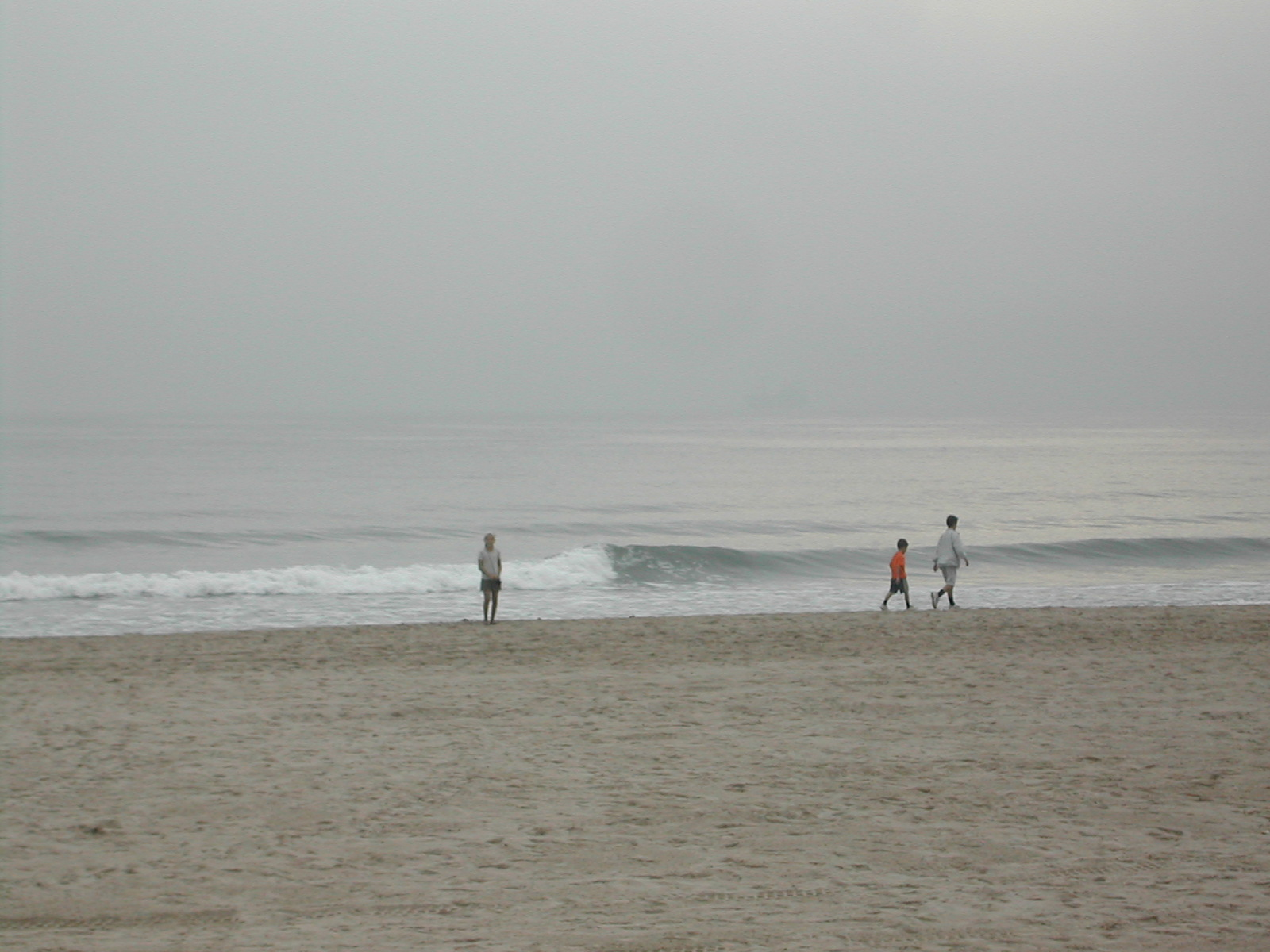
Platja de Pinedo Nuvolada.JPG

Pinedo is a village inside the boundaries of the Pobles del Sud district, in the municipality of Valencia. Its population consisted in 2,531 inhabitants in 2017.
