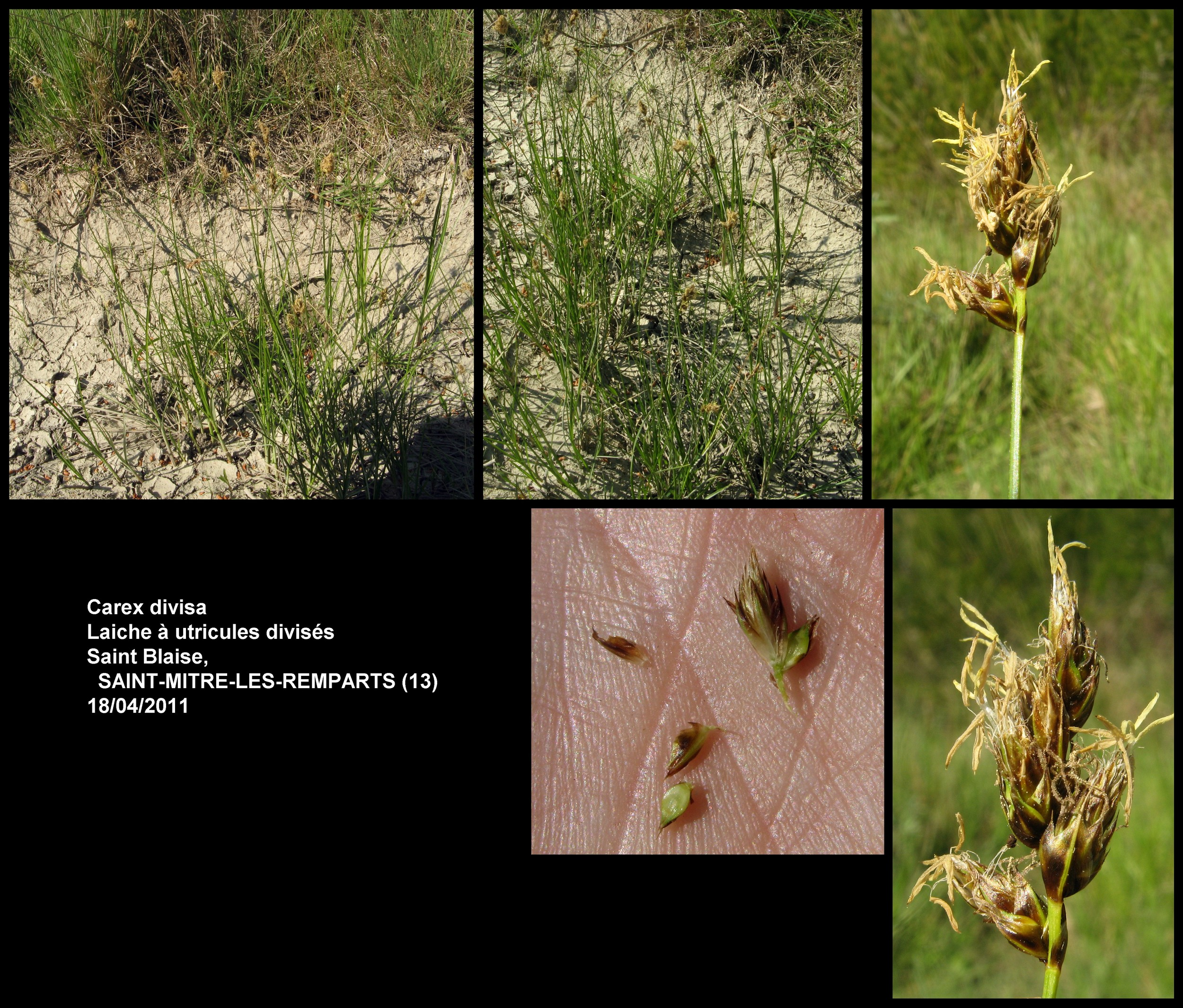

Scientific classification
- Kingdom: Plantae
- Clade: Tracheophytes
- Clade: Angiosperms
- Clade: Monocots
- Clade: Commelinids
- Order: Poales
- Family: Cyperaceae
- Genus: Carex
- Species: C. divisa

Binomial name
- Carex divisa Huds.

= Carex divisa =

Divided sedge

Species of grass-like plant

Carex divisa is a species of sedge known by the common names divided sedge and separated sedge. It is native to Europe, Asia, and North Africa, and considered naturalized in Australia, New Zealand, and scattered locations in North America.
