= Mostaghim =

The Mostaghim family is one of the prominent Iranian families.

== History ==
The family began before the Qajar dynasty and has been one of the most successful families in Iran. After the fall of the Qajars, they relocated to the holy city of Qom, 40 kilometers south of Tehran, where they managed to take over the market and own many villages. Their close ties to political leaders of the Pahlavi regime and also religious leaders of Ghom made them one of the few families to survive the Islamic Revolution with little to no damage. After the revolution, the family has partly relocated to northern parts of Tehran as the place of residence.

== Characteristics ==
They are known as a moderate religious family with keen interests in Iranian culture. Having a hierarchical structure, the oldest member of the family is also the head of the family who is consulted in all business matters. Mohammad Mostaghim, a world-renowned neurosurgeon, who is rumored to be in line as the next head of the family, currently resides in Canada with his family. Currently, the Mostaghim family owns and operates the Zafran and Persian-carpet industry along with close ties to flour-producing companies and lucrative businesses in Tehran's Grand Bazaar in Iran.
