= Castellar-Oliveral =

Coordinates: 39.4264°N 0.3642°W

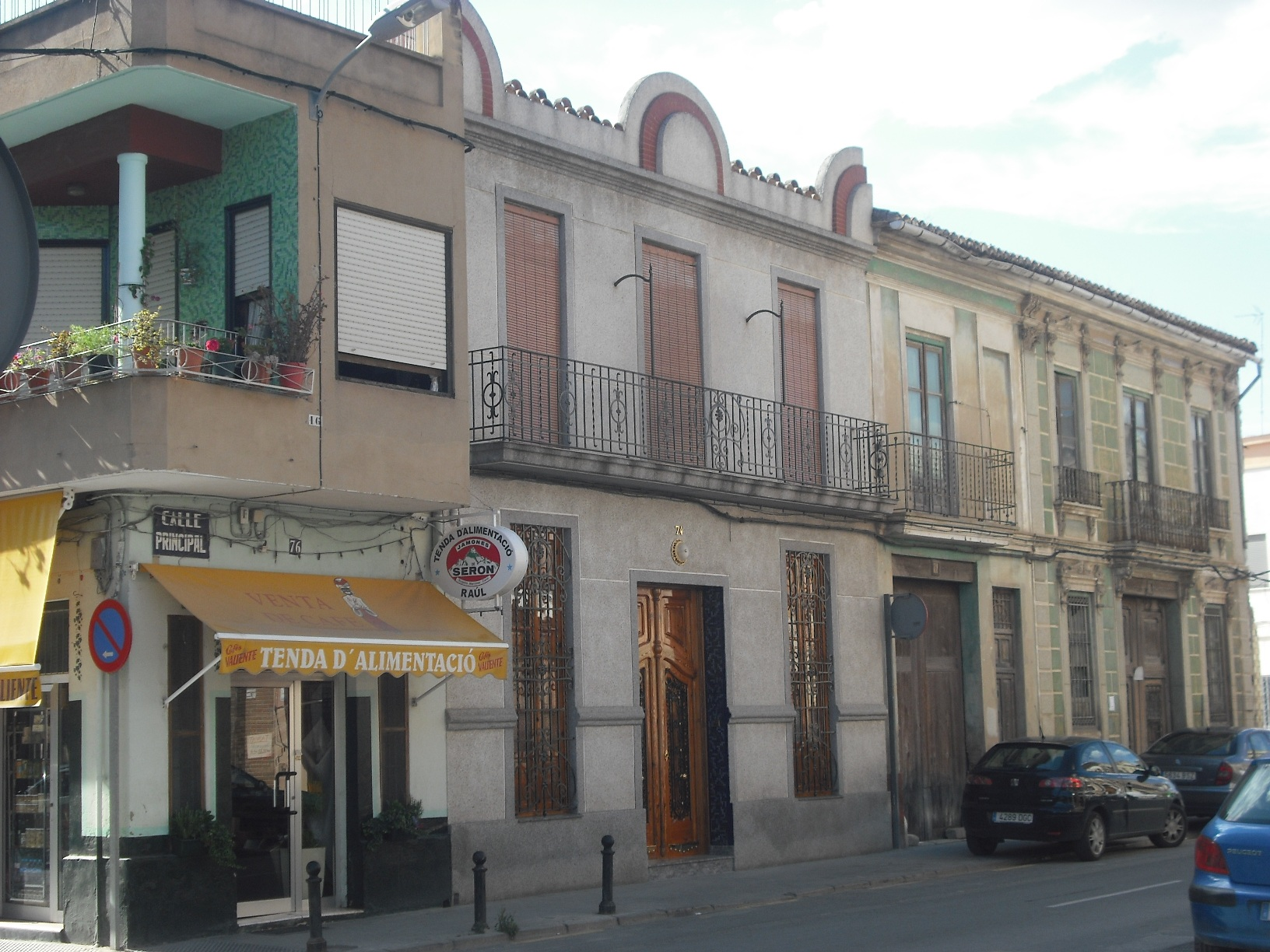
- Interactive map of Castellar-Oliveral
- Country: Spain
- Province: Valencia
- Municipality: Valencia

Population (2013)
  - Total: 7,020

Castellar-Oliveral is a village in Valencia, Spain. It is part of the municipality of Valencia. The nearest train station is Alfafar-Benetússer which is 25 minute walk away from village or takes 10 minute by car drive to reach there from station. The nearest metro station is Quatre Carreres which is 14 min walk away from village.
