= El Palmar, Valencia =

Locality in Valencia, Spain

Coordinates: 39.311°N 0.318°W

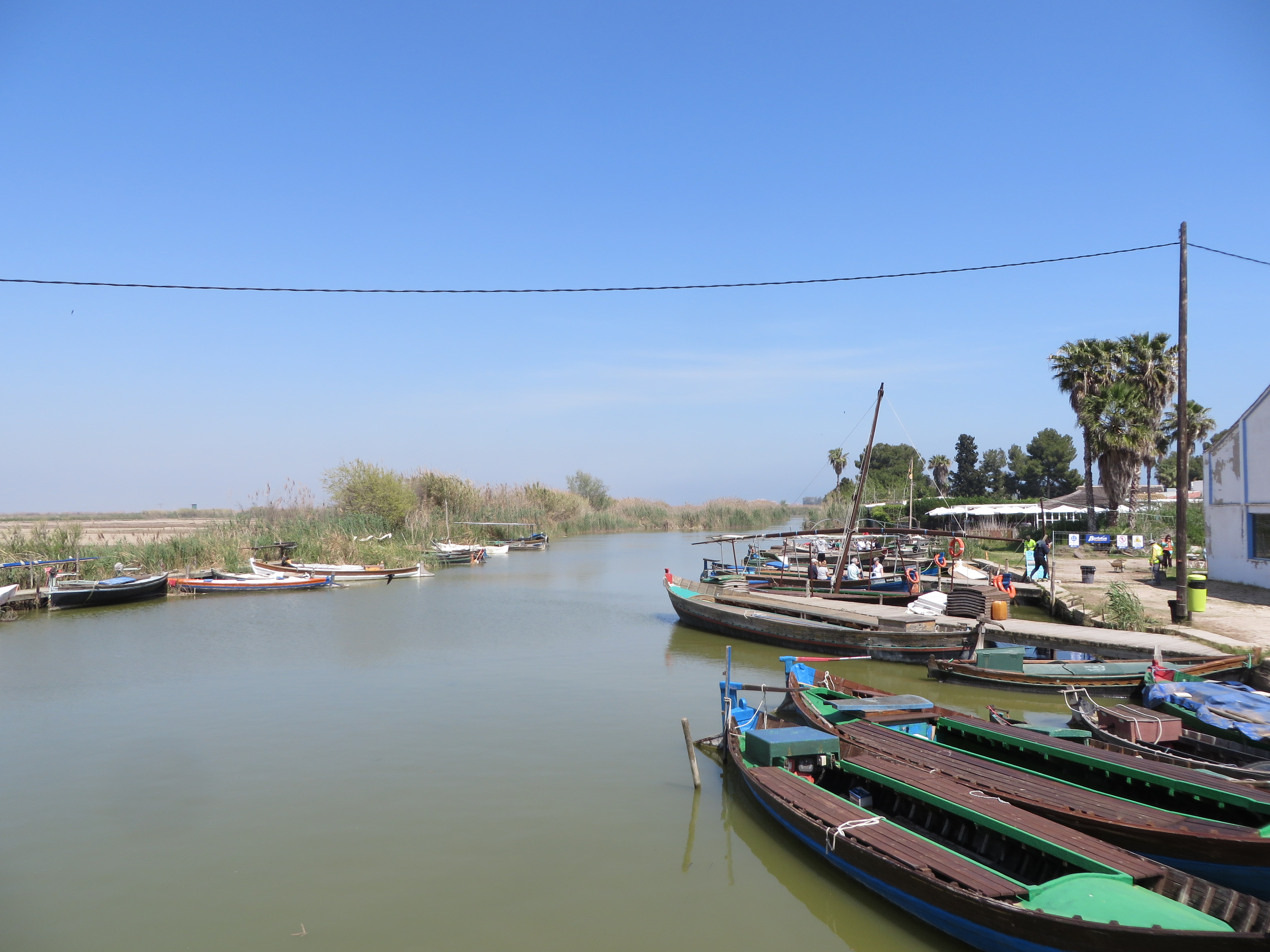
Boats on the canal

El Palmar is a village located in the Pobles del Sud district of the municipality of Valencia. It had a population of 755 in 2017.
