= Sueca, Spain =

Sueca
- Town and municipality
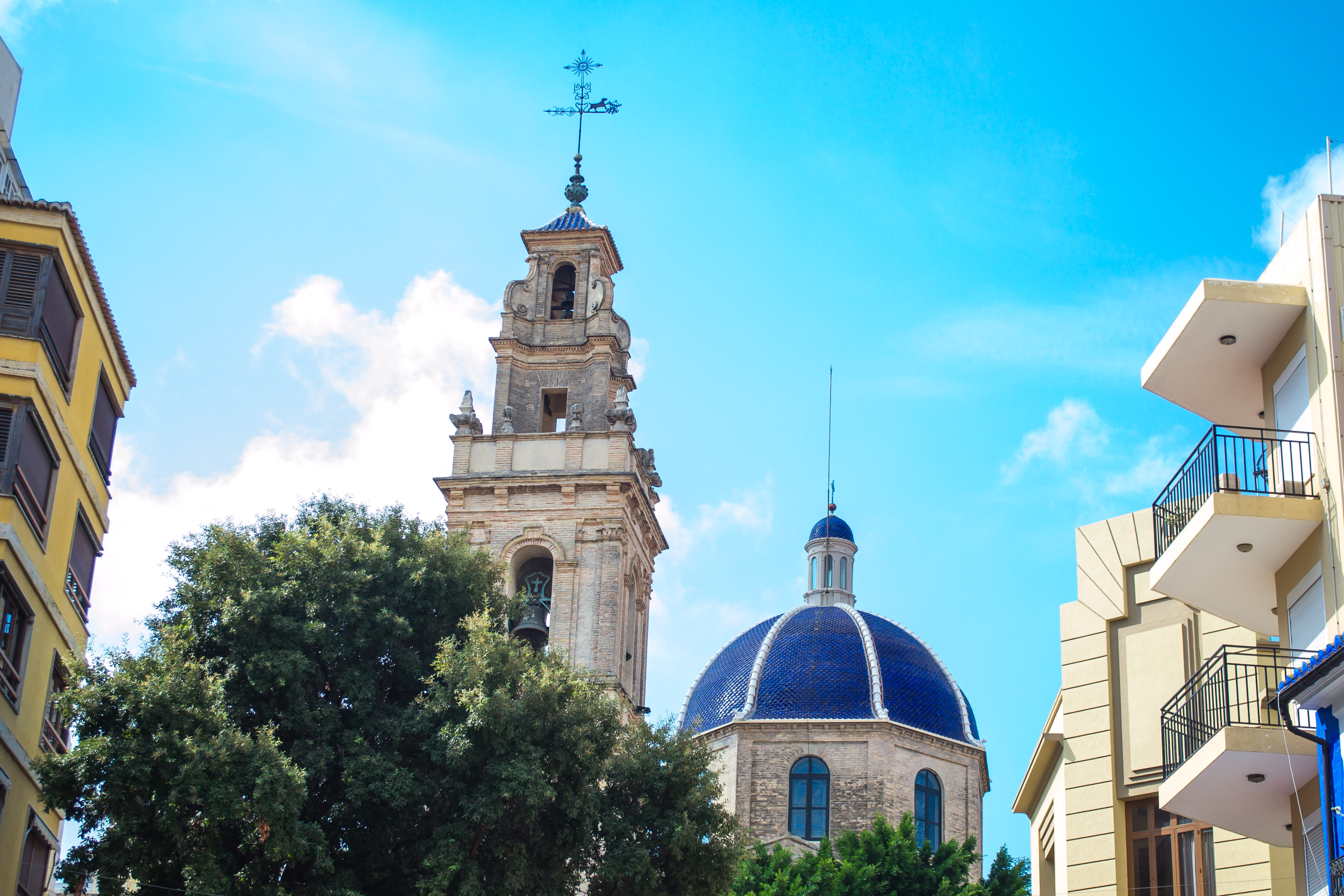

- Flag Coat of arms

- Location in Spain Sueca (Valencian Community) Sueca (Spain)
- Coordinates: 39°12′0″N 0°18′41″W
- Country: Spain
- Autonomous community: Valencian Community
- Province: Valencia
- Comarca: Ribera Baixa
- Judicial district: Sueca

Government
  - Alcalde (Mayor): Roger Tamarit (2015) (Compromís)

Area
  - Total: 92.5 km^{2} (35.7 sq mi)
- Elevation: 3 m (9.8 ft)

Population (2025-01-01)
  - Total: 29,194
  - Density: 316/km^{2} (817/sq mi)
- Demonyms: Suecan • suecà, -ana (Val.) • suecano/a (Sp.)
- Official language(s): Valencian; Spanish
- Linguistic area: Valencian
- Time zone: UTC+1 (CET)
  - Summer (DST): UTC+2 (CEST)
- Postal code: 46410
- Website: Official website

Sueca (Note: Pronunciation of Sueca: Valencian: [suˈɛka], also [suˈɛkɛ] Spanish: [ˈsweka]) is a town and municipality in eastern Spain in the Valencian Community. It is situated on the left bank of the river Xúquer. The town of Sueca is separated from the Mediterranean Sea 11 kilometres (7 miles) to the east by the Serra de Cullera, though the municipality possesses 7 km (4 mi) of Mediterranean coastline. Some of the architecture shows Moorish roots—the flat roofs, view-turrets (miradors), and horseshoe arches—and the area has an irrigation system dating from Moorish times. Rice processing is the principal industry, though oranges are also exported.

== Villages included in the municipality ==
- Mareny de Barraquetes

== Twin Towns ==
- Évreux, France
- Palafrugell, Spain

== See also ==
- List of municipalities in Valencia
