= El Perellonet =

Coordinates: 39.2797°N 0.2775°W

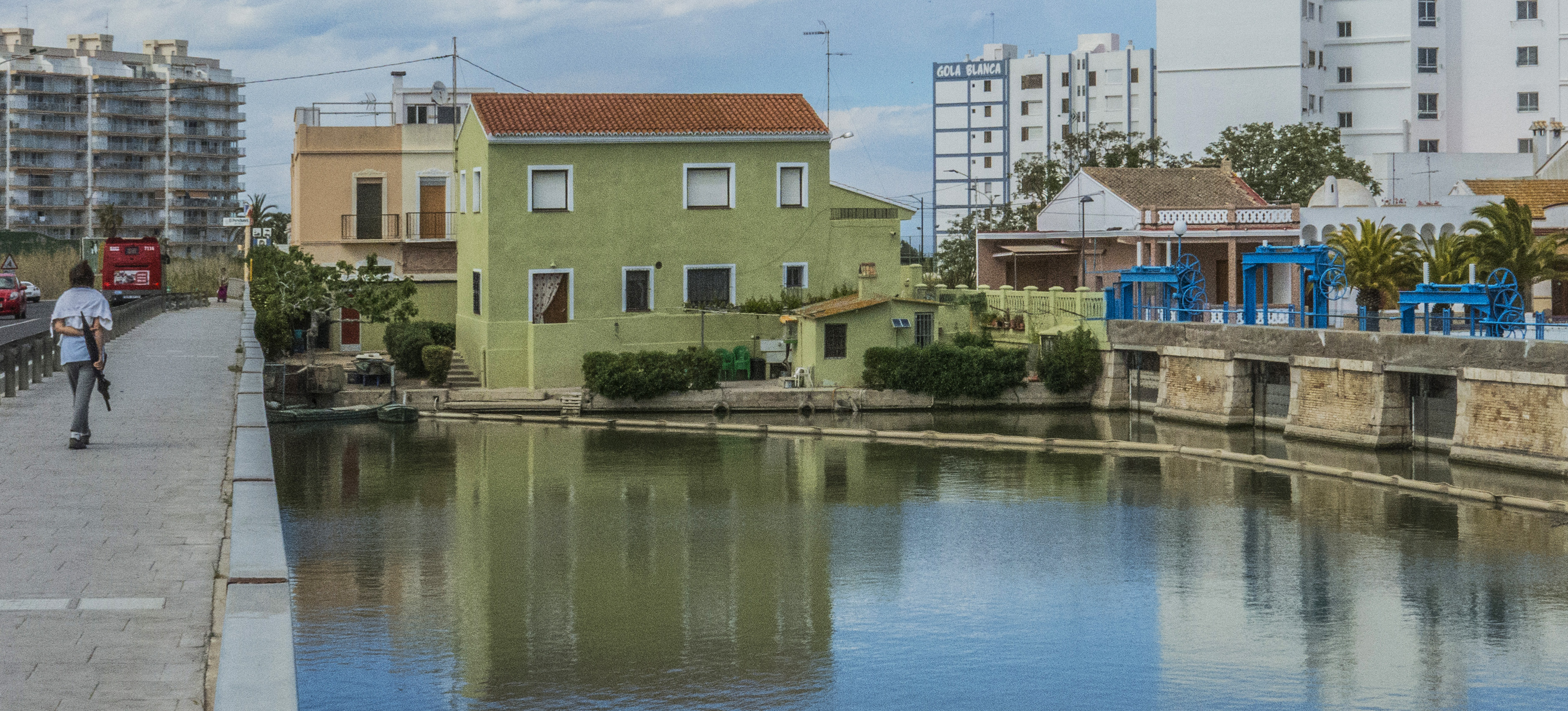
- Interactive map of El Perellonet
- Country: Spain
- Province: Valencia
- Municipality: Valencia
- Elevation: 2 m (6.6 ft)

Population (2009)
  - Total: 1,602

El Perellonet is a town that is administratively part of the municipality of Valencia, in the Valencian Community, Spain.
