= Mareny de Barraquetes =

Coordinates: 39.2022°N 0.3153°W

El Mareny de Barraquetes
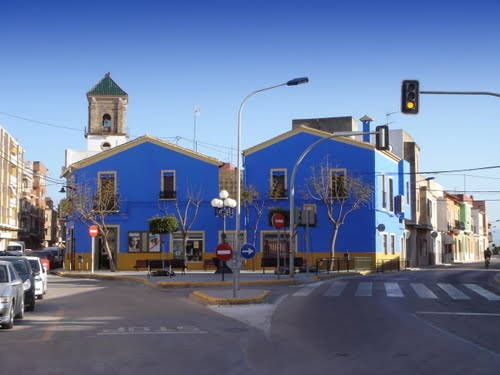

- Coat of arms
- Interactive map of El Mareny de Barraquetes
- Country: Spain
- Province: Valencia
- Municipality: Sueca
- Elevation: 1 m (3.3 ft)

Population (2013)
  - Total: 855

El Mareny de Barraquetes is a village in Valencia, Spain. It is part of the municipality of Sueca.
