= Massanassa =

- Municipality
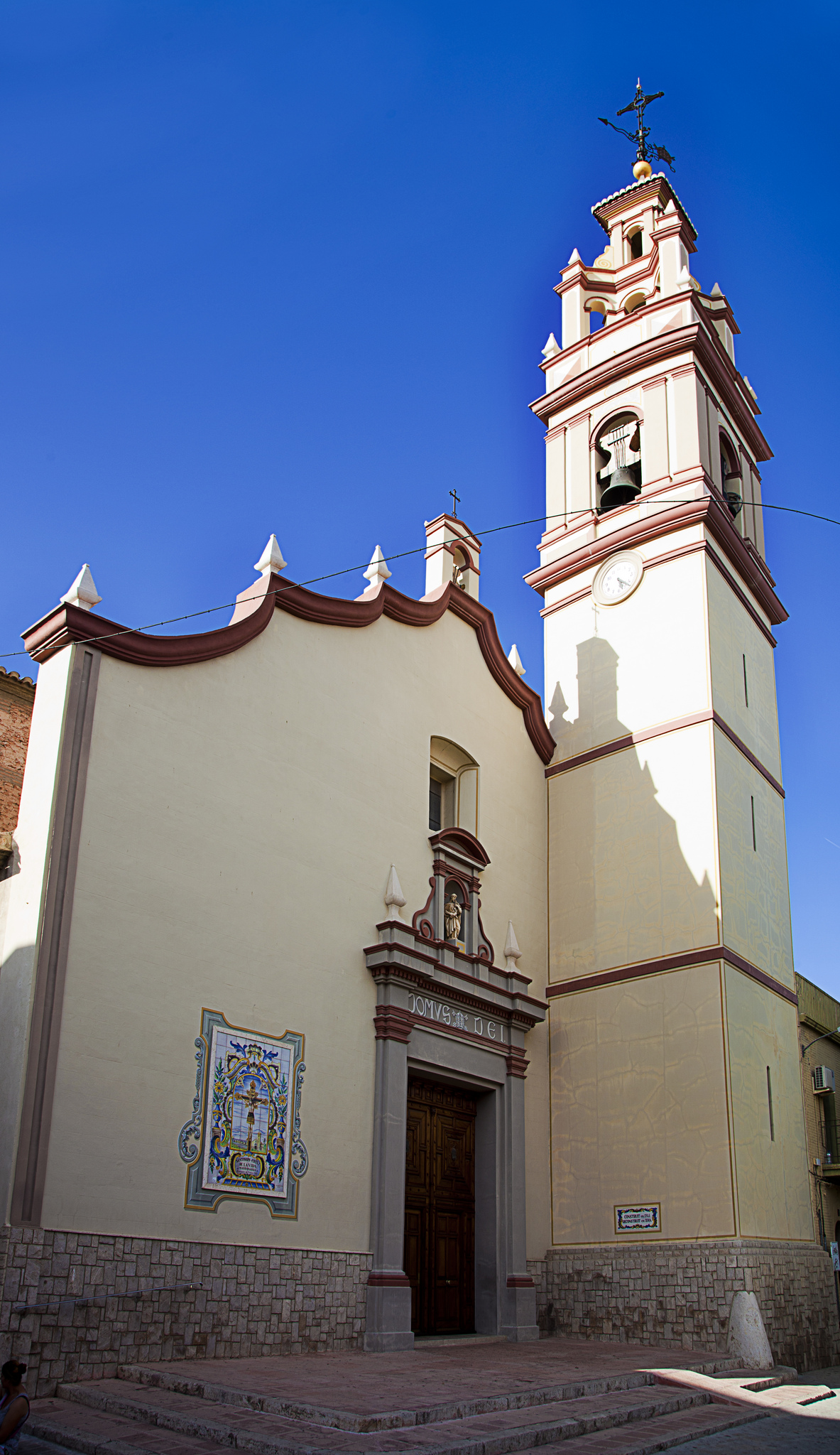

- Coat of arms

- Location in Spain
- Coordinates: 39°24′30″N 0°23′56″W
- Country: Spain
- Autonomous community: Valencian Community
- Province: Valencia
- Comarca: Horta Sud
- Judicial district: Catarroja

Government
  - Alcalde: Vicente Salvador Pastor Codoñer (PP)

Area
  - Total: 5.60 km^{2} (2.16 sq mi)
- Elevation: 14 m (46 ft)

Population (2025-01-01)
  - Total: 10,607
  - Density: 1,890/km^{2} (4,910/sq mi)
- Demonym(s): Massanasser, Massanassera
- Time zone: UTC+1 (CET)
  - Summer (DST): UTC+2 (CEST)
- Postal code: 46470
- Official language(s): Valencian
- Website: Official website

Massanassa is a municipality in the comarca of Horta Sud in the Valencian Community, Spain.

== See also ==
- List of municipalities in Valencia
