= Ayora (disambiguation) =

Ayora is a municipality in the Valencian Community, Spain.

Ayora may also refer to:

== People ==
- Ana Ayora (born 1983), American actress
- Ángel Ayora (born 2004), Spanish golfer
- Isidro Ayora (1879–1978), Ecuadorian politician
- María Pia Ayora (born 1962), Peruvian swimmer

== Places ==
- Castle of Ayora, a castle in Spain
- Isidro Ayora Canton, a canton in Ecuador
- Isidro Ayora, Ecuador, a town in Ecuador
- Puerto Ayora, a town in Ecuador
- Valle de Ayora, a comarca in Spain
