= Júcar =

River in Spain

Júcar Júcar (Spanish) Xúquer (Valencian)
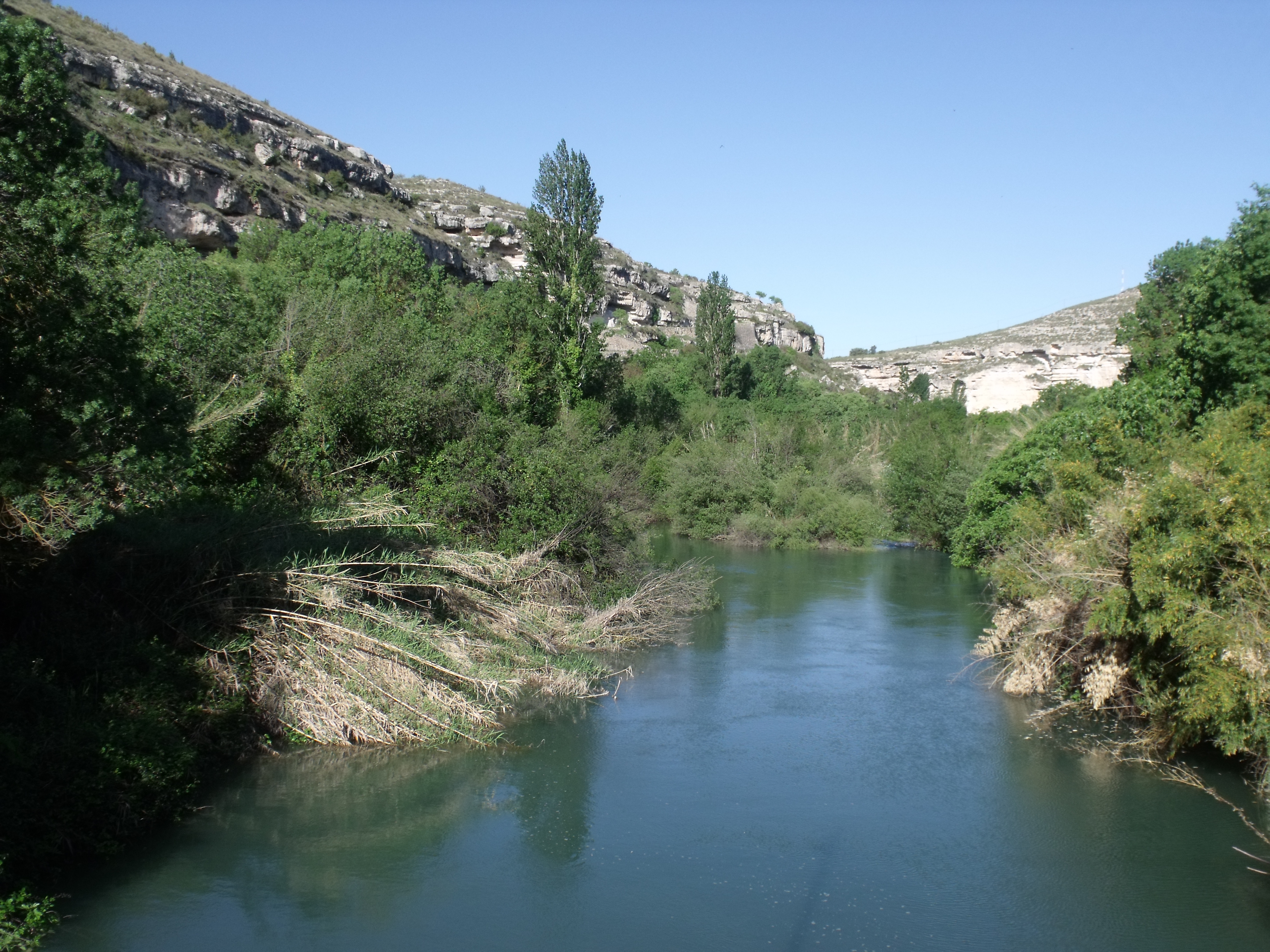
- View of the Júcar as it passes near Cubas

Location
- Country: Spain

Physical characteristics
- Source: Ojuelos de Valdeminguete, Montes Universales
  - location: Tragacete, Spain
  - coordinates: 40°23′57″N 1°50′39″W
- Mouth: Gulf of Valencia, Mediterranean Sea
  - location: Cullera, Spain
  - coordinates: 39°09′05″N 0°14′19″W
  - elevation: 0 m (0 ft)
- Length: 509 km (316 mi)

Basin features
- Tributaries
  - left: Cabriel, Magro
  - right: Albaida
- Waterbodies: Cortes-La Muela Reservoir

The Júcar (Spanish: [ˈxukaɾ]) or Xúquer (Valencian: [ˈʃukeɾ]) is a river in Spain, on the Iberian Peninsula. The river runs for approximately 509 kilometres (316 mi).

Its source is located at Ojuelos de Valdeminguete, in the municipality of Tragacete, province of Cuenca, on the eastern flank of the Montes Universales in the Sistema Ibérico. Its tributaries include the Cabriel, the Magro, and the Albaida.

The Júcar River flows first southward and then eastward through the towns of Cuenca, Alcalá del Júcar, Cofrentes, Alzira, Sueca, Alarcón and Cullera, a town located near its mouth into the Gulf of Valencia in the Mediterranean Sea. It crosses the provinces of Cuenca, Albacete and Valencia. On the mid-course of the river, it is impounded by the Cortes-La Muela Reservoir near Cortes de Pallás.

In 1982, the river Júcar broke the Tous Dam, causing the biggest flood in Spanish history, with a flow speed of 16,000 cubic metres per second (570,000 cu ft/s), killing more than 30 people. This flood was the most important one in the whole history of Spain because, at that time, the people had thought that the Tous Dam was indestructible. The flood was called La pantanada de Tous (which, in English, would translate something like: The Swamp of Tous).

== See also ==
- List of rivers of Spain
- Rambla del Poyo
