= Cofrentes Nuclear Power Plant =

Nuclear power plant in Confrentes, Spain

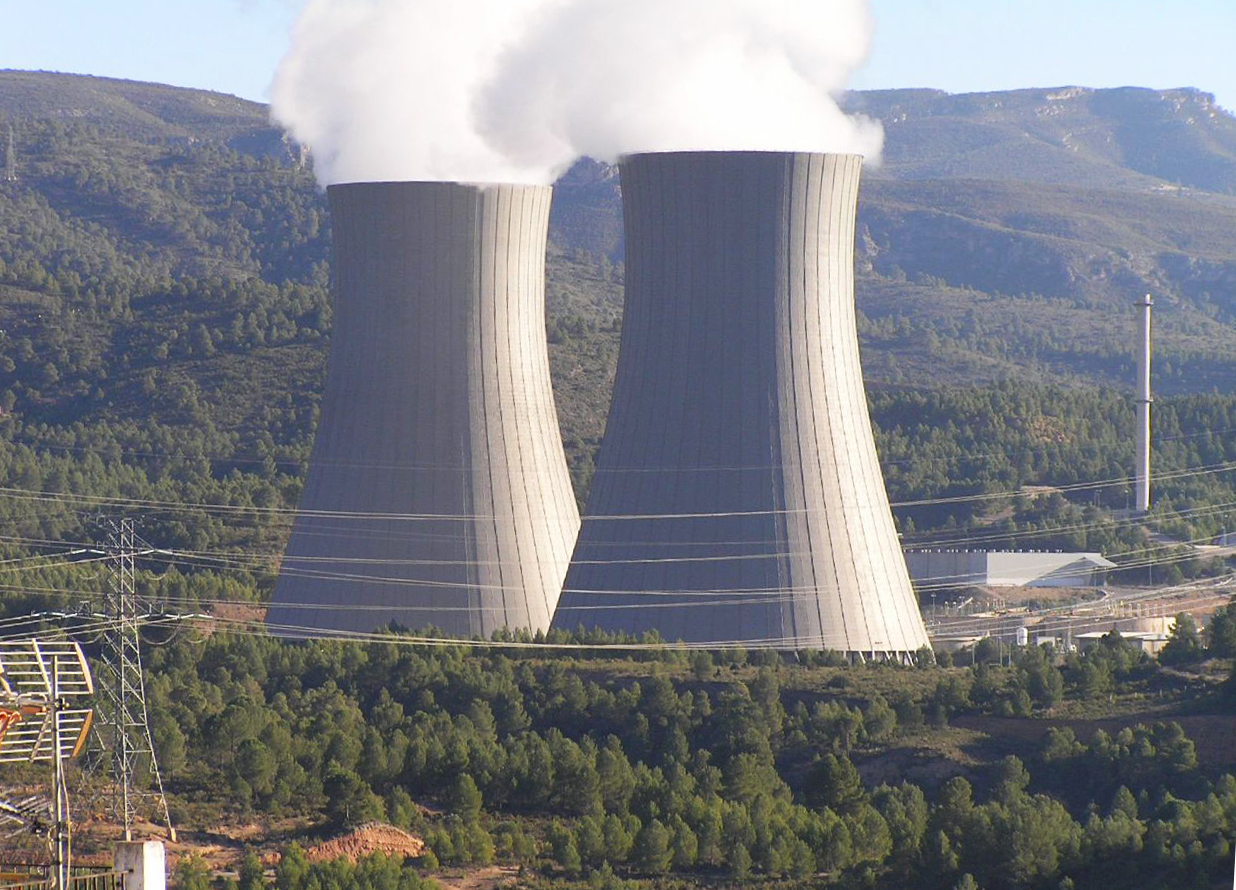
- Plant cooling towers
- Country: Spain
- Coordinates: 39°13′0″N 1°3′0″W
- Status: Operational
- Construction began: 1975
- Commission date: October 14, 1984
- Owner: Iberdrola
- Operators: Iberdrola, S.A.

Power generation
- Units operational: 1 x 1102 MWe
- Nameplate capacity: 1,064 MW
- Annual net output: 8,872 GWh

External links
- Website: www.cncofrentes.es
- Commons: Related media on Commons

Cofrentes Nuclear Power Plant is a BWR-type nuclear power station located about 2 kilometres (1.2 mi) southeast of Cofrentes, Spain. Cofrentes NPP entered service on October 14, 1984, with an installed power capacity of 992 MWe. Through improvements, it has successfully expanded its power gradually, first to 110 percent (1,092 MWe), and then to 111 percent (1,102 MWe), allowing the plant to supply virtually all of the domestic energy consumption in Valencian Community.

== Construction ==
Cofrentes NPP is built on the right flank of the Júcar river, which provides water for cooling. It is located 61 km from Valencia in a straight line (100 km by road) and about three km from the Cofrentes volcano, which is generally considered inactive, although its magma chamber still feeds the source of the spa, Hervideros.

Approval to construct the plant was granted by the Ministry of Industry and Energy in 1972. The following two years were dedicated to basic engineering, acquiring the main equipment and securing the construction authorization. In 1975, the Cofrentes Municipal Council issued the building permit and business activity licence, and the Ministry of Industry authorized construction.

The plant project began in March 1973, when contracts were drawn up with General Electric Co. to supply the reactor, turbogenerator (turbine and generator) and the first load of fuel.

The reactor, a BWR-6 type, uses slightly enriched uranium which fissions generate energy as heat. This heat raises the temperature of water used for cooling the core within the primary circuit, while it is transformed into steam which is used directly in the primary circuit to move the turbine coupled to the alternator.

The containment is MARK-III type, in which the primary containment consist of the drywell, a circular suppression pool and metal containment. Secondary containment is formed by the auxiliary building, fuel building and reactor building.

== Management, production and electrical contribution ==
Cofrentes is owned 100 percent by Iberdrola. It has an average annual production of nearly 8,900 million kWh, which equates roughly to the domestic energy consumed by the five million families living in the Valencian Community.

During 2010, it generated 9,549 million kWh operating continuously for 365 days a year. This figure was about 5 percent of national energy production (under the ordinary system)

Throughout 2012, Cofrentes NPP generated 9,376 million kWh, which represents close to 4.9 percent of the national grid energy production (under the ordinary system) and 82 percent of electricity produced in Valencian Community. It generated this electricity while avoiding the emission of approximately 6.5 million tons of CO_{2}.

In 2013, Cofrentes Nuclear Power Plant generated 8,325 billion kilowatt hours (kWh), equivalent to approximately 4.9% of Spain's national electrical production (under the ordinary system) and 14.7% of the energy produced from nuclear sources. The Plant has been running at 87% of its total capacity, operating with generator coupled to the energy grid for 7,801 hours a year.

== Reported Events History ==
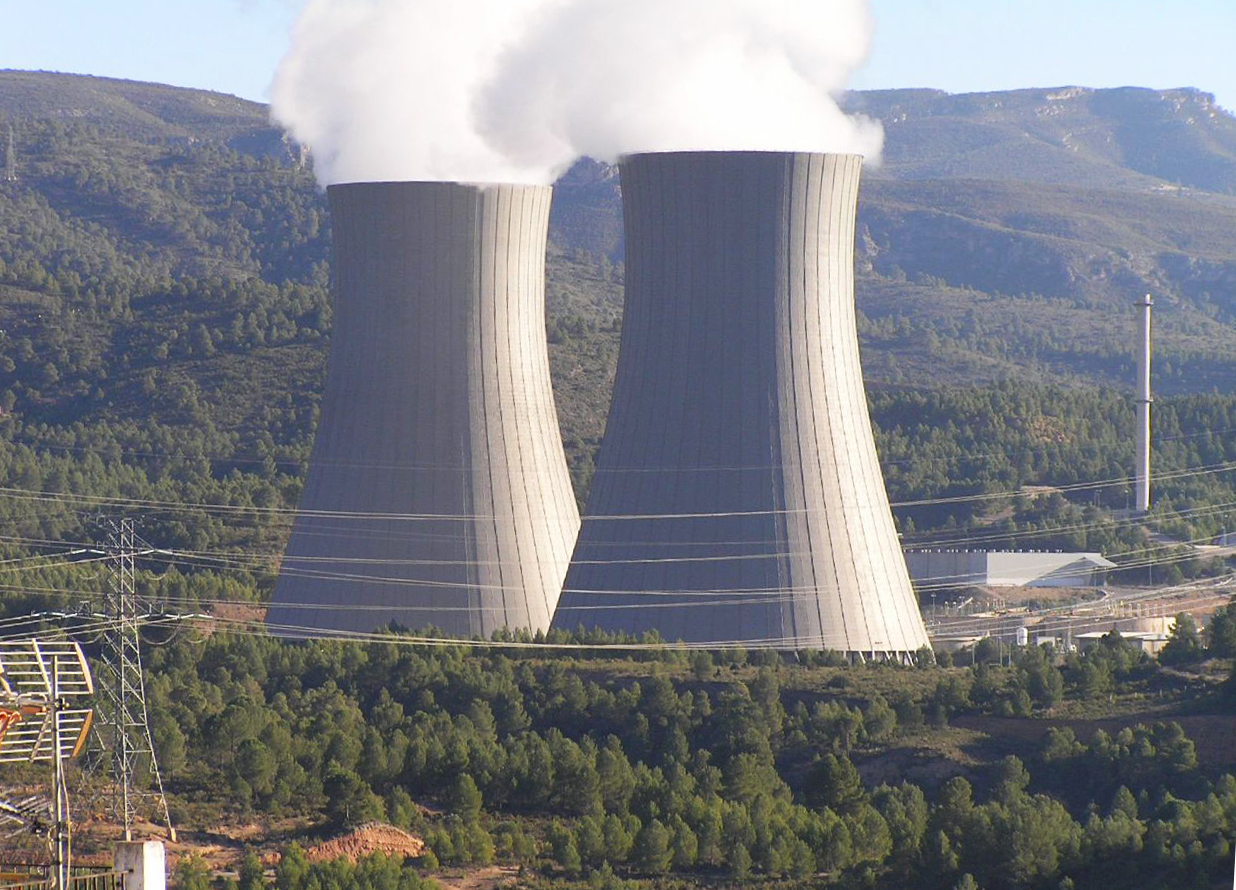
Cofrentes NPP Cooling towers

From 2001 through March 10, 2011, Cofrentes NPP made 25 unplanned shutdowns. It notified the Nuclear Safety Council (CSN, in Spanish) of 102 security events—three of these were Level 1 on the International Nuclear Event Scale (INES). The Cofrentes plant has notified an average of 10 reported events each year in the last decade.

In the 90s, it had reported three Level 1 events, which were described as 'anomalies'.

2002

In 2002, Cofrentes NPP had two consecutive reported events during a refueling outage.

2005

For at least two hours on September 21, 2005, a small leak from a hose at the waste building's detergent evaporator released a 0.03 mSv/h dose rate in an area classified as a controlled area (limit 0.025 mSv/h). This reported event had no impact on workers or the environment.

2006

In 2006, Cofrentes NPP reported 10 events, all of which were classified as Level 0 on the International Nuclear Event Scale (INES).

2007

In 2007, Cofrentes NPP notified the nuclear regulator of fifteen events. All were classified as Level 0 on the INES scale.

2008

In 2008, Cofrentes' owner notified CSN of eleven events. All were classified as Level 0.

2009

In 2009, eight events were reported to CSN. All were classified as Level 0 (INES), except for the September 22 fall of a sub-element in the spent-fuel pool.

- On September 22, 2009, the plant shut down for refueling outage for an inspection of the oxid layer of irradiated fuel. A sub-element that was being checked, came off and fell, striking the platform of the inspection machine from a height of about 10 cm. It then pivoted and turned to lie horizontally on the racks of fuel elements stored in the pool. The event had no impact for people or environment. It was classified as INES 1.

2010

- On May 13, 2010, it was found that the fill-level instrumentation of one of the storage tanks of the standby liquid control system was displaying an incorrect volume reading for the reservoir, both in the control room and in the local display. This resulted in the tank containing less volume than specified. The volume was corrected. The event was classified as INES 1.

2011

- On January 14, 2011, a radiation monitor of the control room erronosly activated. This caused the closure of two isolation valves, activating the smoke extractor in the cafeteria and the automatic start of the emergency filtration system of the control room. The affected monitor was replaced. This event was classified as INES 0.
- On February 7, an incident occurred while opening a valve on the recirculation line of the high-pressure core spray system. A relay that controls the valve failed; it was replaced. The reported event was classified as INES 0.
- On February 15, Cofrentes NPP management declared an emergency alert because of the intrusion of fifteen Greenpeace activists in the area of the cooling towers, far from the nuclear buildings. They said they were highlighting the potential vulnerability of nuclear power plants to attack. During the intrusion, activists broke a fence, two security guards were slightly injured and two others had bruises according to statements of Cofrentes NPP and some guards. However, Greenpeace says they made a peaceful protest and did not use violence. The Plant informed the CSN and activated the procedures of the plant security plan and notified local authorities, who took control of the situation. During the intrusion, the plant continued operating normally.
- On June 17, the emergency filter unit of the control room (Train A), due to a defect in a radiation monitor relay of the control room.
- On September 25, there was a breakdown in the engine of one valve of the shutdown cooling system, during a refueling outage.
- On October 7, a discrepancy between the measurement of portable instrumentation and fixed instrumentation during verification of flow in the gas treatment reserve system was identified during a refueling outage.
- On November 29, a drain line of a turbine control valve broke down, causing a loss and increasing the temperature inside its building. It was the 10th year (classified as Level 0). There was an unscheduled power-down of up to 20 percent.

2012

- On April 22, 2012, a smoke detector was activated for less than 10 minutes, caused by an attempted arson. A burnt coil switch corresponding to an auxiliary equipment of the diesel generator III was identified. The event was classified preliminarily as Level 0.

== See also ==
- Nuclear power in Spain
- Nuclear power by country
