= Sierra del Mugrón =

Mountain range in Spain

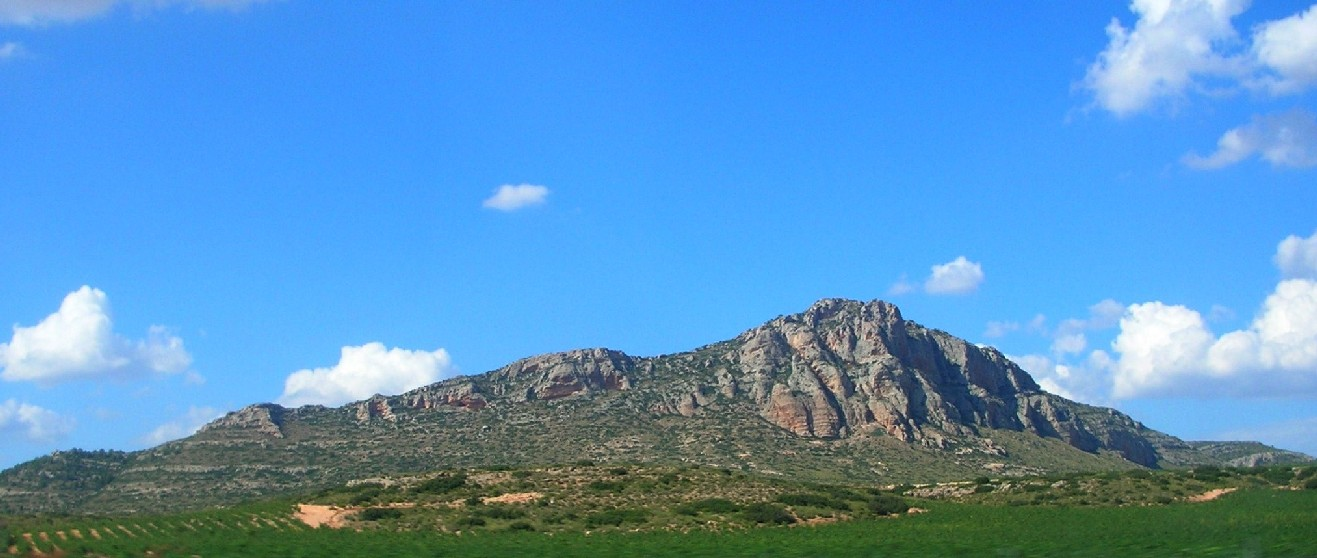
- The Sierra del Mugrón seen from the south near Almansa

Highest point
- Elevation: 1,209 m (3,967 ft)
- Coordinates: 38°55′21″N 01°09′22″W

Geography
- Location within Spain
- Location: Valle de Cofrentes, Valencian Community; Almansa, Castile-La Mancha
- Parent range: Isolated range

Geology
- Mountain type: Limestone (Miocene)

Climbing
- Easiest route: From Almansa, Ayora or Alpera

Sierra del Mugrón is a 16.6 km (10 mi) long mountain range located between the shire of Valle de Cofrentes (Valencian: Vall de Cofrents), Valencian Community, and Almansa, Castile-La Mancha, Spain. It is an isolated range between the Iberian System and the Cordillera Prebética. Its highest point is 1,209 m. The northern section of this range is within the Ayora (Valencian: Aiora) municipal term, while the southern belongs to Almansa.

There are remains of an Ancient Iberian settlement in Castellar de Meca, between Ayora and Alpera.

This mountain range is an isolated area with a sizeable amount of wildlife, foremost of which are the wildcat, boar, little bustard, Eurasian stone-curlew, peregrine falcon, European nightjar, black wheatear, common wood pigeon, Dartford warbler, red-legged partridge and Bonelli's eagle.

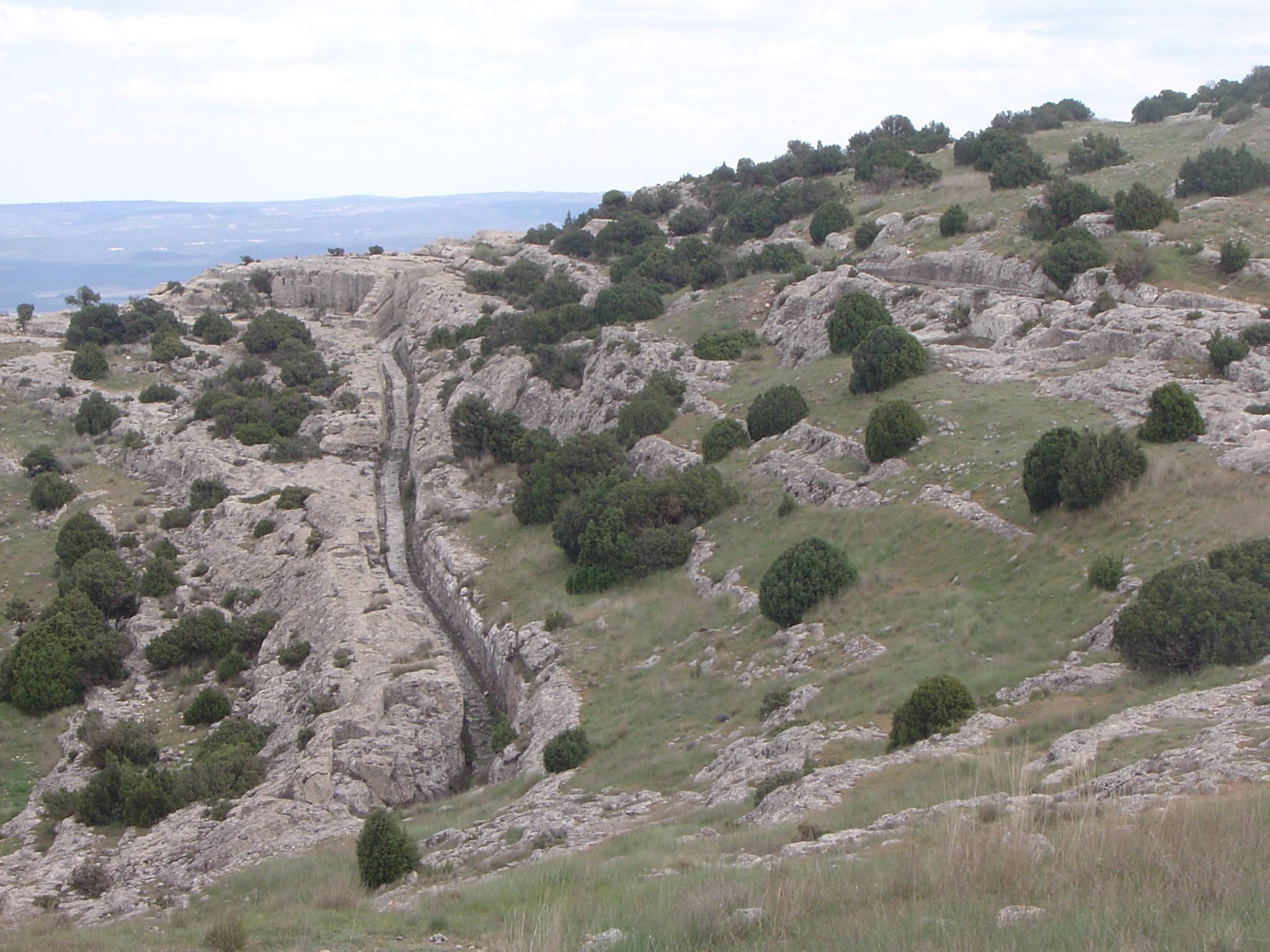
Northern area close to Castellar de Meca.

== See also ==
- Mountains of the Valencian Community
