= Magro (river) =

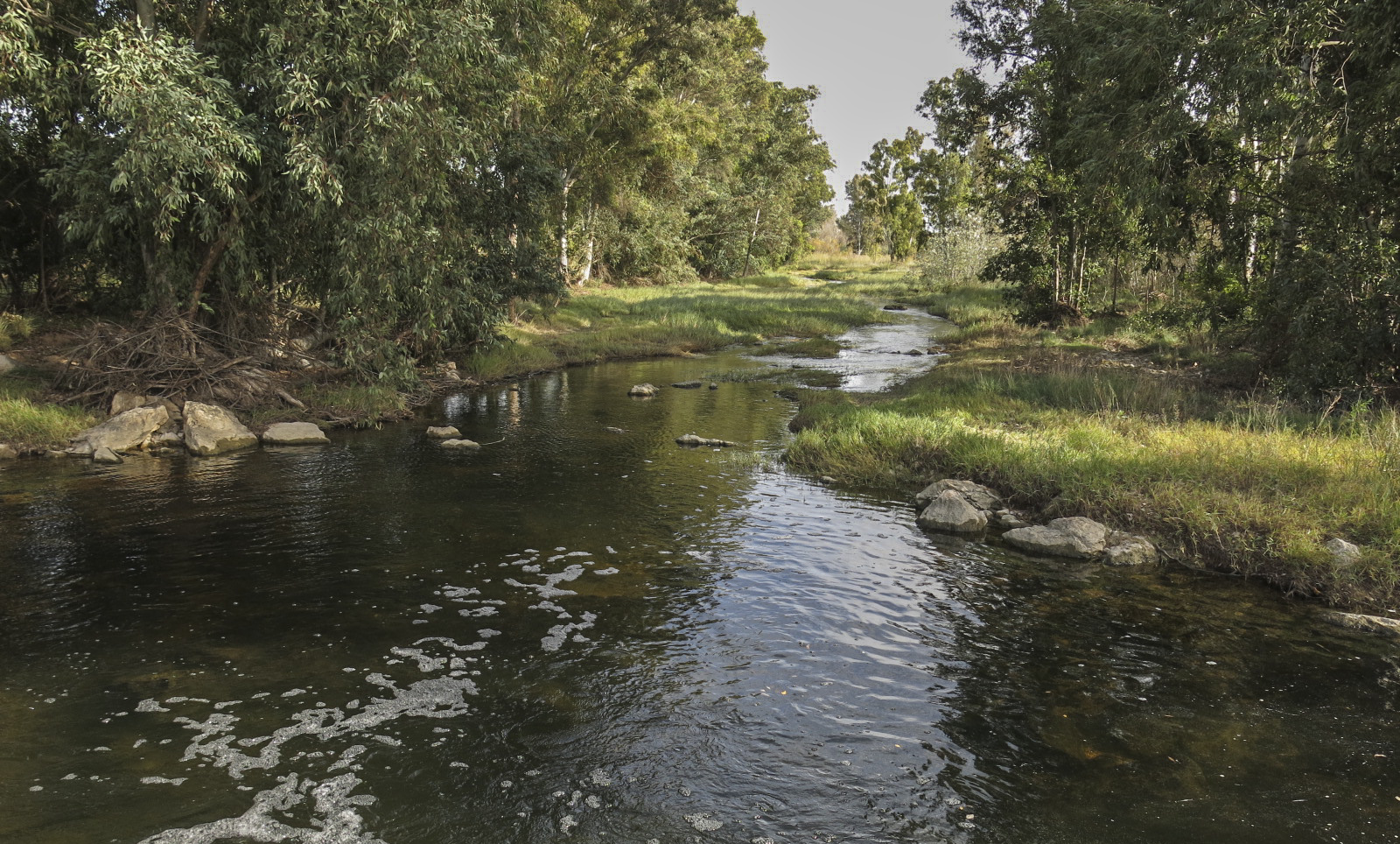
- The river in Guadassuar

Location
- Country: Spain

Physical characteristics
- Source: Sierra de Mira
  - location: Aliaguilla
  - elevation: 1,100 m (3,600 ft)
- Mouth: Júcar
  - location: Algemesí
  - coordinates: 39°11′07″N 0°24′43″W
- Length: 130 km (81 mi)

The Magro or Magre is a river in the eastern Iberian Peninsula. It is a left-bank tributary of the Júcar.

The source is located at 1,100 metres above sea level in the Sierra de Mira, within the municipal limits of Aliaguilla, in the Spanish province of Cuenca. Immediately crossing the border between Castilla–La Mancha and the Valencian Community, it runs 130 km down to Algemesí, where it joins the Júcar. It generally features a modest flow. Together with the Escalona, Sallent, and Albaida, it contributes to most of the floods of the Júcar.

In the 2024 Spanish floods, a flash flood of the Magro was responsible for casualties in the towns of Algemesí and Utiel, among others. During this event, the low level of the Forata reservoir near Yátova prevented further damage.
