= Expulsion of the Moriscos =

17th century expulsion of Moriscos from Spain

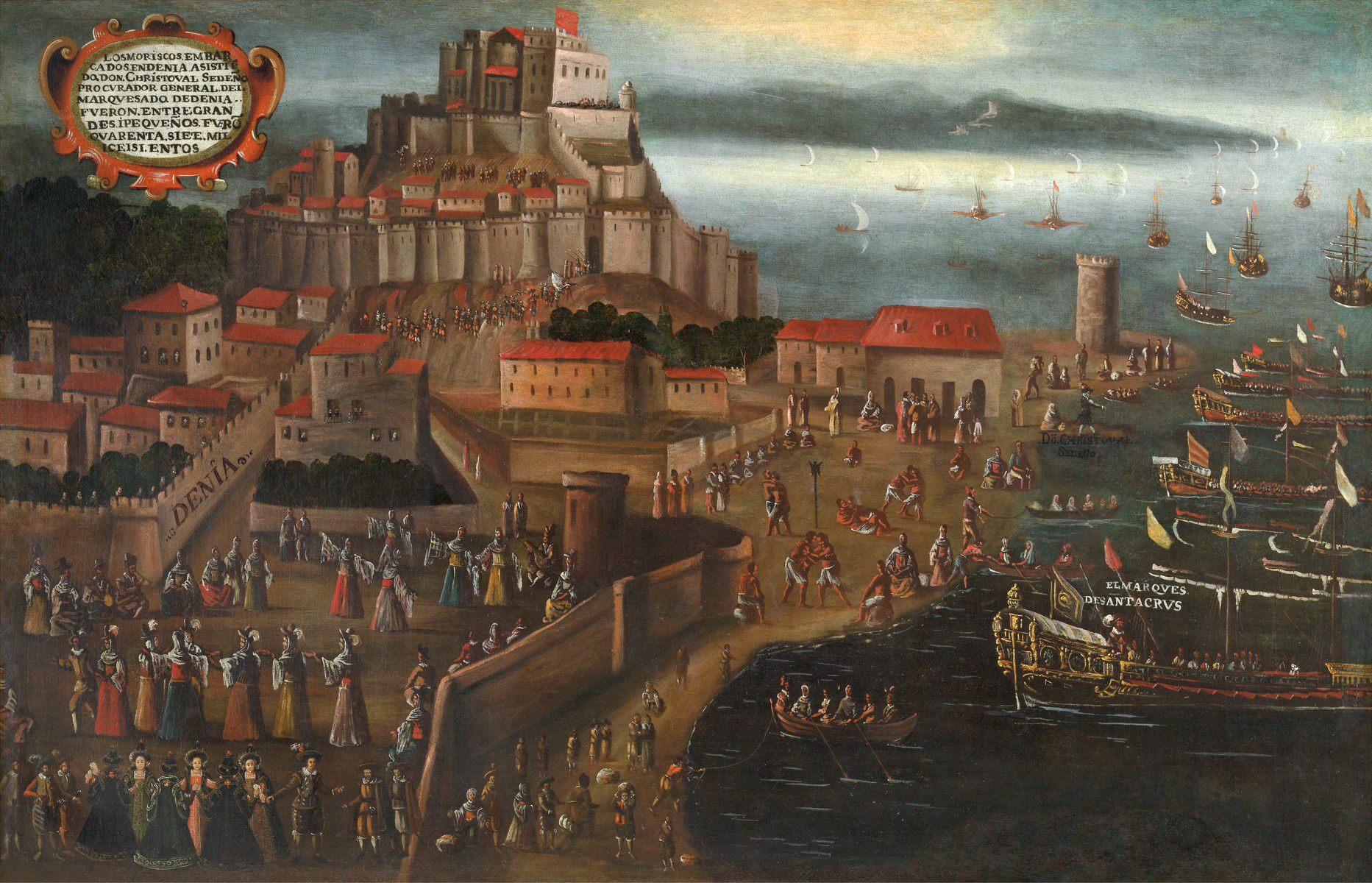
The Expulsion at the Port of Denia, by Vicente Mestre

The Expulsion of the Moriscos (Spanish: Expulsión de los moriscos) was decreed by King Philip III of Spain on April 9, 1609. The Moriscos were descendants of Spain's Muslim population who had been forced to convert to Christianity. Since the Spanish were fighting wars in the Americas, feeling threatened by the Ottomans raiding along the Spanish coast and by two Morisco revolts in the century since Islam was outlawed in Spain, it seems that the expulsions were a reaction to an internal problem of the stretched Spanish Empire. Between 1609 and 1614, the Crown systematically expelled Moriscos through a number of decrees affecting Spain's various kingdoms, with varying levels of success. Between 1492 and 1610, approximately three million Muslims left or were expelled from Spain and found refuge in the northern Maghreb (northern Morocco and northwestern Algeria).

Although initial estimates of the number expelled such as those of Henri Lapeyre range between 275,000 and 300,000 Moriscos (or 4 percent of the total Spanish population), the extent and actual success of the expulsion order in purging Spain of its Moriscos have been increasingly challenged by modern historians, beginning with the seminal studies conducted by François Martinez (1999) and Trevor Dadson (2007). Dadson estimates that, of a Morisco population of 500,000, a figure accepted by many, around 40 percent avoided expulsion altogether (and tens of thousands of those expelled managed to return).

The areas in which the expulsions were particularly successful were the eastern Kingdom of Valencia, where Muslims represented the bulk of the peasantry and ethnic tensions with the Christian, Catalan-speaking middle class were high; as a result, this region implemented the expulsion most severely and successfully, leading to the economic collapse and depopulation of much of its territory, worsened by the bubonic plague that hit Valencia only a few years later. According to Henri Lapeyre, the Kingdom of Aragon was, after Valencia, experienced the largest rate of expelled Moriscos and, subsequently, suffered the consequences as disastrously as Valencia.

Of those permanently expelled, the majority eventually settled in the Barbary Coast (mainly in northern Morocco and northwestern Algeria); approximately 30,000 to 75,000 people ultimately returned to Spain. Those who avoided expulsion or who managed to return to Spain merged into the dominant culture. The last mass prosecution against Moriscos for crypto-Islamic practices took place in Granada in 1727, with the majority of those convicted receiving relatively light sentences. By the end of the 18th century, Islamic and Morisco identity were considered to have been extinguished in Spain.

== Background ==
Suspicions and tensions between Moriscos, who were called New Christians, and the other Christians, who were called Old Christians, were high in some parts of Spain but practically nonexistent in others. While some Moriscos held influence and power (with positions in the clergy), others (particularly in Valencia and Aragon) were a source of cheap labour for the local aristocracy. Where sectarian conflict existed, Old Christian communities suspected the Moriscos of insincerity in their Christianity.

Those who remained Muslims were known as the Mudéjar. Many of the Moriscos, in contrast, were devout in their new Christian faith. In Granada, some Moriscos became Christian martyrs and were killed by Muslims for refusing to renounce Christianity. Much of the enmity between the Old Christians and New Christians was based upon ethnicity rather than religion.

Several revolts broke out, the most notable being the 1568–1573 revolt against an edict of Phillip II's banning Arabic, Arabic names, and requiring Moriscos to give up their children to be educated by priests. After the suppression of the revolt, Philip ordered the dispersal of the Moriscos of Granada to other areas. Philip expected that this would collapse the Moriscos and facilitate their assimilation into the Christian population. This may have occurred to a degree with Granada's Moriscos; however, such attempt did not spread to Valencia and Aragon, where Islam was still widely practised and ethnic tensions were higher than in the rest of Spain.

At around the same time, Spain recognized the loss of more than half of its holdings in the Low Countries to the Protestant Dutch Republic. The ruling class already thought of Spain as the defender of Catholic Christendom, and this defeat helped lead to a radicalization of thinking and a desire to strike a blow to regain Spain's honour. Some critiques of Spain from Protestant countries included insults of the Spanish as corrupted by the Muslims and crypto-Muslims among them, (which some of the nobility may have taken personally).

The situation further deteriorated during the early 17th century. A recession struck in 1604 as the amount of gold and treasure from Spain's American holdings fell. The reduction in the standard of living led to increased tensions between the Moriscos and Old Christians for employment.

== Attitudes toward the Moriscos ==
The number of Moriscos in Spain at the time of expulsion is unknown; most estimates are based upon the numbers of Moriscos who were expelled. Figures of between 300,000 and 400,000 are often cited. Modern studies estimate between 500,000 and approximately one million Moriscos present in Spain at the beginning of the 17th century, of a total population of 8.5 million – approximately 6 to 12 percent of Spain.

A significant proportion of Moriscos resided in the former Crown of Aragon – where it is estimated they constituted 20 percent of the population – and the Valencia area, specifically, where Moriscos comprised 33 percent of the total population. The wealthy and those who lived in the cities were mostly Christians, while the Moriscos occupied outlying countrysides and the poorer suburbs of the cities.

=== Crown of Castile ===
The situation was considerably different in the Crown of Castile (which included the Guadalquivir valley of Andalusia). The proportion of Moriscos was considered to be lower. More significantly, the majority were former Mudejar (Muslim) Christians who were highly integrated in mainstream society and had abandoned many of their distinguishing cultural traits. Crucially, unlike in Valencia, they did not suffer from hostility from their Old Christian neighbours, many of whom actively protected them from attempts by the Crown of Castile to expel the Moriscos and Mudejar, to the point that in Plasencia the Crown officials sent to deport Moriscos were jailed upon arrival. In Avila, the local Moriscos were integrated in the clergy and government positions to avoid expulsion.

An additional Morisco community co-existed with these Mudejar Moriscos: a large number of Granada Moriscos who had been deported or dispersed following the uprising and war of the Alpujarras, who were the targets of more suspicion within the areas they had settled. Local sympathies for Moriscos meant that Castile and Andalusia experienced only half-hearted efforts at identifying and expelling them. The expulsions were slower, and involved far less thorough processes, than in the Crown of Aragon (and particularly Valencia). A significant portion of Moriscos – according to Dadson a majority – either avoided expulsion or returned during the years following their expulsions.

=== Crown of Aragon ===
In the Kingdom of Valencia, which held the bulk of the Morisco population in the Crown of Aragón, the situation was radically different than in the Crown of Castile. Valencian Moriscos were the overwhelming majority of the landless peasantry, living segregated from Christians. Economic and social rivalry was a major driver of resentment towards them, particularly from the Middle classes of artisans. This had boiled over before in 1520, when in the Revolt of the Brotherhoods, the artisan guilds of Valencia revolted against both the landed aristocracy and the Muslim Mudéjar peasantry. Although the rebellion was ultimately defeated in 1523, the rebels killed many, and forced the mass baptism and conversion of the remainder of the Muslim population. In 1525, these forced conversions were upheld by Charles V, which therefore created the Moriscos of Valencia. Due to the long-standing hostility of their Christian neighbors, during the expulsion, the plight of the Valencian Moriscos was considered the worst.

In Spain, there was near-universal agreement that Islam was a threat to be crushed. However, it was unclear how that should apply to the Moriscos, who were officially Christians. Some clerics such as Fray Luis de Aliaga, a royal councilor, supported allowing time for the Moriscos to assimilate and become full Christians. This option was lightly supported by the Catholic Church in Rome. The most dedicated defenders of the Moriscos were the Valencian and Aragonese nobility, as their self-interests were involved. These nobles benefited the most from the cheap workforce that the Moriscos provided.

Opposing this view were a variety of Spain's notables and social classes. Clerics against Aliaga included Jaime Bleda, the most prominent member of Valencia's Inquisition. Bleda made several early proposals to King Philip III to banish or otherwise end the 'Morisco problem'; he even recommended genocide. At first, these entreaties were without success. In 1596 the Duke of Lerma, King Philip III's chief financial officer, accused the Moriscos of collaboration with Muslim Barbary pirates, a charge that had dogged them for years. Still, while many in the Christian population held to this, others considered that this threat had long since passed. The Council of Aragon, in opposing any punitive measures, wrote that even if they wished to betray Spain, the Moriscos were in no position to do so "for they possess no arms, nor supplies, nor fortified positions, nor a base for the Turkish fleet." Nothing came of it at the time; however, the Duke of Lerma continued his antipathy toward the Moriscos.

=== Criticism of the expulsion ===
The humanist Pedro de Valencia wrote a treatise on the Moriscos in late 1605 or early 1606. His Tratado acerca de los Moriscos de España was composed at the request of Philip III's chaplain, Fray Diego de Mardones.

Valencia is a critic of the king's Morisco policy. He denigrates limpieza de sangre (purity of blood):

Let us not fear that the blood of Spaniards will be infected by being mixed with that of the Moors [Muslims]; many have had this from time immemorial and it does not harm them because idem est non esse et non apparere (to be is not the same as to appear), as the jurists say.

He considers the expulsions unjust and un-Christian, born out of greed and hatred:

If we consider again the question of justice, how can one justify before God or man, or what Christian could there be that could bear to see in the fields, and on the beaches such a large crowd of baptised men and women, who were calling out to God and to the world that they were Christians and wished to be so and that people were taking their children and their property from them out of greed and hatred, without listening to them or judging them in court, and they were sending them to become Moors [Muslims].

He admits that the Quran is a false book and that Muslims engage in taqiyya (strategic lying). His preferred solution to the problema morisco is assimilation. The duty of Spanish Christians was to fast and pray:

[...] nor would it be a bad idea if the Moriscos were to see that we were saddened and were fasting for their salvation; that would be more edifying for them than for us to call them Moorish dogs.

== Edict and expulsion ==
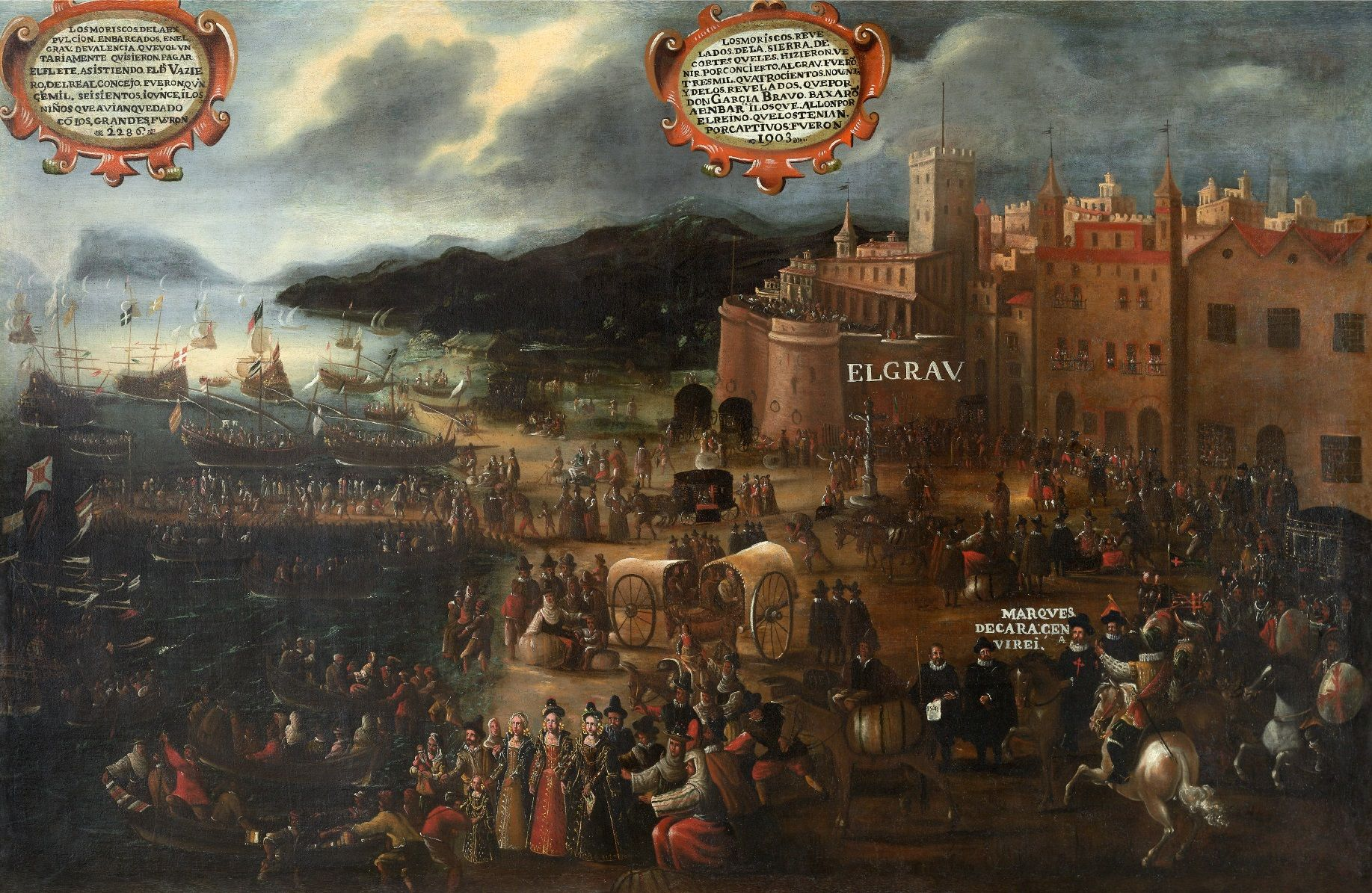
Embarking of the Moriscos at Valencia, by Pere Oromig

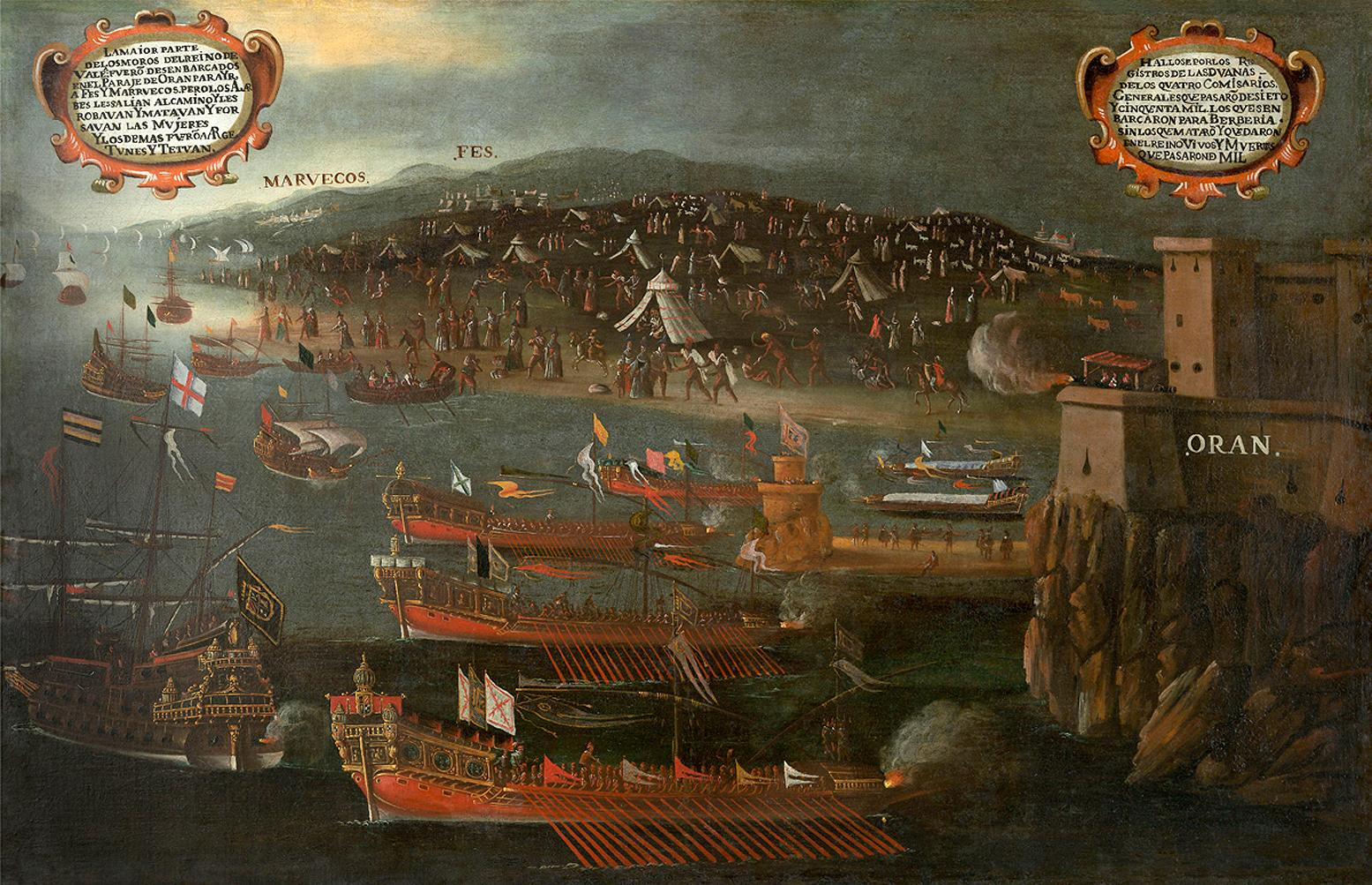
Disembarking of the Moriscos at Oran port (1613, Vicent Mestre), Fundación Bancaja de Valencia

The Duke of Lerma eventually convinced King Philip III with the help of the Archbishop of Valencia, Juan de Ribera, who considered the Moriscos as universally heretics and traitors. The archbishop added an idea to make the plan more persuasive to the king: the king could confiscate the assets and properties of the Moorish population, thereby providing a dramatic one-time boost to the royal coffers. Ribera also encouraged the king to enslave the Moriscos for work in galleys, mines, and abroad as he could do so "without any scruples of conscience," but this proposal was rejected.

On April 9, 1609, the edict was signed to expel the Moriscos. The government knew that exiling so many would be problematic. It was decided to start with Valencia, where the Morisco population was greatest. Preparations were taken in the strictest secrecy. Starting in September, tercio battalions arrived from Italy. They took up positions in the main ports of Valencia: Alfaques, Dénia, and Alicante. On September 22, the viceroy ordered the publication of the decree. The Valencian aristocracy met with the government to protest the expulsion, as losing their workers would ruin their agricultural incomes. The government offered some of the confiscated property and territory of the Moriscos to them in exchange, but this didn't come close to compensating for the loss. The Moriscos would be allowed to take anything they could carry, but their homes and land would pass into the hands of their masters. Burning or other destruction of their homes before the transfer was prohibited on death penalty.

Certain exceptions were granted: six families of every 100 would be allowed to stay behind and maintain the infrastructure of areas that had been predominantly Morisco-inhabited. Very few took advantage of this, as it was thought likely that they would still be later exiled. Additionally, the expulsion was optional for children younger than four years old. This was later expanded to 16 years of age. Archbishop Ribera strongly opposed this part of the measure; he lobbied that at the very least the children should be separated from their parents, enslaved, and Christianized "for the good of their souls."

On 30 September, the first of the exiles were taken to the ports, where, as a last insult, they were forced to pay their own fare for the trip. The Moriscos were transported to the northern Maghreb, where at times they were attacked as 'invaders' in their host countries. Other times, small revolts broke out on the ships, causing some of the exiles to be slain in battle with the crew. This caused fears in the Morisco population remaining in Valencia, and, on 20 October, there was a rebellion against the expulsion. The rebels numbered 6,000 and held the remote valley of Ayora and Muela de Cortes. Five days later, a new rebellion broke out on the southern coast, with 15,000 rebels holding the Valley of Lugar.

The rebels were defeated by November. In only three months, 116,000 Moriscos had been transported to the Maghreb (mainly northern Morocco) from Valencia. The beginning of 1610 saw the expulsion of the Moriscos of Aragon (the specific area of Aragon, not all the lands of the old Crown of Aragon); 41,952 were sent to Morocco (via Alfaques), and 13,470 were sent over the Pyrenees Mountains to France. The exasperated French sent most of them to the port of Agde, and those who took the land route were charged both the transit fee and the sea fare. In September, the Moriscos of Catalonia were exiled. Andalusia exiled some 32,000 Moriscos.

The expulsions of the Moriscos of Castile, Extremadura, and Andalusia (then all parts of the Crown of Castile) were difficult tasks; they were dispersed throughout the land after being broken in 1571 by the rebellion (rather than being concentrated in any one location). Because of this, the Moriscos were given a first option of "voluntary departure," in which they could take their most valuable possessions and any sellable items. The expulsion in Castile lasted three years (1611 until 1614).

== Numbers and success of the expulsion ==
It is difficult to gauge the success of the expulsion in purging Spain of its Morisco population, a topic which has been recently subject to academic reassessment. Even estimates of the number of Moriscos present in Spain prior to expulsion vary, ranging from numbers based on records of expulsion orders, such as those of Lynch and Lapeyre, (around 300,000) to more recent estimates of up to approximately one million Moriscos expelled.

Equally, traditional Spanish historiography, and early studies from which it drew heavily, paint a picture of a well-run affair that succeeded in channeling the vast majority of Moriscos (around 270,000) out of the country during a short period of time. As a result, early estimates of Moriscos who succeeded in remaining in the country were as low as 15,000.

A number of recent investigative studies have challenged the traditional discourse on the supposed success of the expulsion in purging Spain of its Morisco population. A number of modern studies have concluded that expulsion met widely differing levels of success, particularly within the two major Spanish crowns of Castile and Aragon. One of the earliest anglophone re-examinations of the Morisco expulsions was carried out by Trevor J. Dadson in 2007. Dadson estimated that as many as 40 percent of Moriscos (around 200,000) never left the country, and up to 70,000 of those expelled managed to return to Spain.

A significant section of his work is devoted to the example of Villarubia de los Ojos in southern Castile. The Morisco population of this town, who may not have been authentic Moriscos but who had been classified as Moriscos to appropriate their property, was the target of three expulsions which they managed to avoid or from which they succeeded in returning from to their town of origin, being protected and hidden by their non-Morisco neighbours. Dadson provides numerous examples, of similar incidents throughout Spain whereby Moriscos were protected and supported by non-Moriscos and returned en masse from North Africa, Portugal or France to their towns of origin.

A similar study on the expulsion in Andalusia concluded it was an inefficient operation which was significantly reduced in its severity by resistance to the measure from local authorities and populations. It further highlights the constant flow of returnees from North Africa, creating a dilemma for the local inquisition who did not know how to deal with those who had been given no choice but to convert to Islam during their stay in Muslim lands as a result of the Royal Decree. Upon the coronation of Felipe IV, the new king gave the order to desist from attempting to impose measures on returnees and in September 1628 the Council of the Supreme Inquisition ordered inquisitors in Seville not to prosecute expelled Moriscos "unless they cause significant commotion."

A 2012 study sheds light on the thousands of Moriscos who remained in the province of Granada alone, surviving both the initial expulsion to other parts of Spain in 1571 and the final expulsion of 1604. These Moriscos managed to evade the royal decrees in various ways, thereafter concealing their true origins. By the 17th and 18th centuries much of these groups accumulated great wealth from control of the silk trade, while holding about 100 public offices. Most of these lineages were completely assimilated throughout generations, despite their practice of endogamy. A compact core of active crypto-Muslims was prosecuted by the Inquisition in 1727, receiving comparatively light sentences. They kept alive their identity until the late 18th century.

Many Moriscos of the Catalan Low Ebro were officially excluded from expulsion and remained in their villages and towns, as well as some other expelled who returned, given the fact that they were very well integrated into Catalan Christian society, unlike those in Aragon, Valencia and the Moriscos of the Catalan low Segre.

Following the decree on the expulsion of Moriscos, crypto-Muslims continued to exist in Spain for centuries. Islam in Spain continued to gradually decline by the 19th century, as its forced concealment led to its demise.

Many Moriscos settled in parts of the Ottoman Empire from around 1609 until the 1620s, notably in Galata.

== Expulsion of Moriscos and population genetics ==
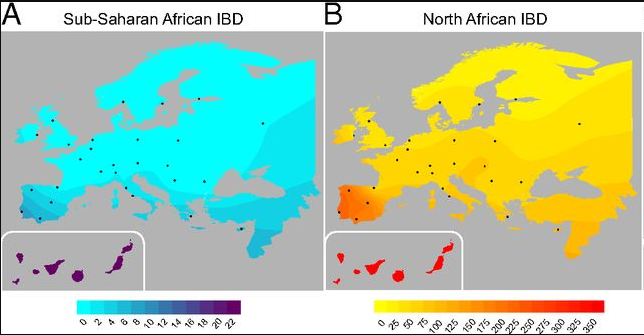
A map of Sub-Saharan African and Maghrebi (North African) haplogroups

Spain's Morisco population was the last population who self-identified and traced its roots to the various waves of Muslim conquerors from the Maghreb. Modern population genetics generally assume Moriscos to have carried both significant Iberian and Maghrebi ancestry, even if, after centuries of presence and intermarriage in Iberia, they were unlikely to differ significantly in ethnic terms from the wider population.

For this reason, studies in population genetics (which aim to ascertain Morisco ancestry in modern populations) search for Iberian or European genetic markers among contemporary Morisco descendants in Morocco and Algeria, and for Maghrebi genetic markers among modern-day Spaniards. A number of recent genetic studies demonstrated that the Maghrebi influence on the Iberian Peninsula is, by far, more pronounced than in other European surrounding territories and populations.

Approximately 5 percent of Spaniards have E-M81 Y-haplogroup, which is the characteristic haplogroup of Berbers (ethnic groups who are generally attributed to Islamic rule and settlement in Iberia. Common Maghrebi genetic markers which appear in relatively high frequencies throughout the Iberian Peninsula as compared to most of the European continent are: Y-chromosome E1b1b1b1 (E-M81), as well as mtDNA Haplogroups L and U6.

Studies coincide that Maghrebi admixture tends to increase in the south and west of the peninsula, peaking in parts of Andalusia, Extremadura, and northwest Castile. Distribution of Maghrebi markers are largely absent throughout northeast Spain and the Basque region. The uneven distribution of admixture in Spain has been explained not only by the extents and intensity of Muslim presence within a particular region, but also by the varying levels of success in attempts to expel the Moriscos from different regions of Spain, as well as forced and "voluntary" Morisco population movements throughout the 16th and 17th centuries.

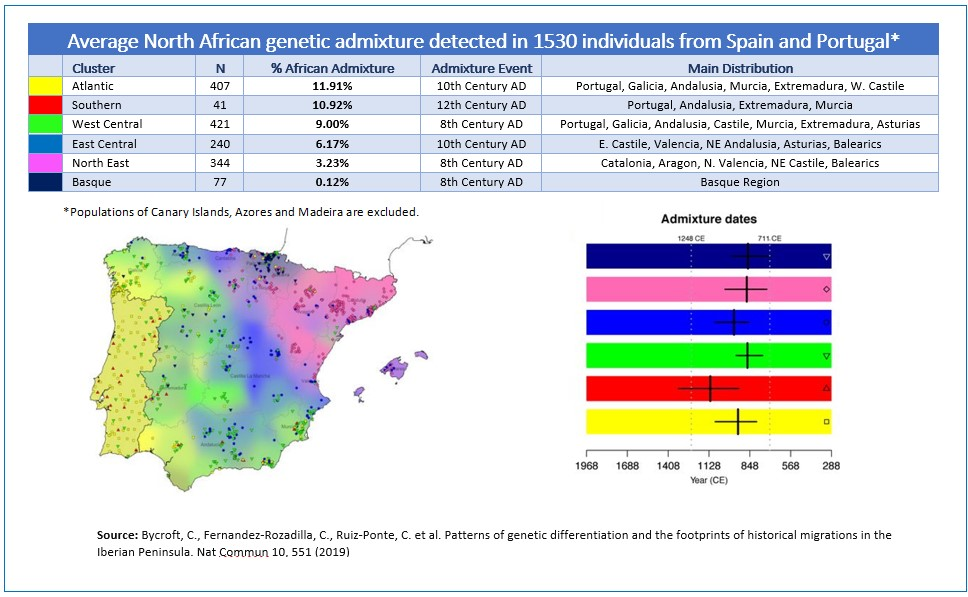
The distribution of North African Admixture in the Iberian Peninsula

As for tracing Morisco descendants in North Africa, to date there have been few genetic studies of populations of Morisco origins in the Maghreb, although studies of the Moroccan population have not detected recent genetic inflow from the Iberian peninsula.

Multiple recently-published genetic studies of Moroccans indicate that millions of northern Moroccans (specifically those from Tétouan,Tangier, Chefchaouen, Asilah, and Fes) carry significant traces (up to 85 percent in some areas) of the Moriscos' Y-DNA and mt-DNA.

A recent study of various Tunisian ethnic groups has found that all were indigenous to the Maghreb, including those who self-identified as Andalusians.

In Turkey, the Y-DNA and mt-DNA of Moriscos is found as a result of the settlement of Moriscos in Galata, from 1609 until the 1620s.

== Consequences ==
The Council of Castile evaluated the expulsion in 1619 and concluded that it had no economic impact for the country. This was basically true for Castile, as some scholars of the expulsion have found no economic consequences on sectors where the Morisco population was important. However, in the Kingdom of Valencia, fields were abandoned and a vacuum was left in sectors of the economy the native Christians could not possibly fill.

With the removal of 33 percent of the inhabitants of the Kingdom of Valencia, some counties in the north of the current Alicante province lost virtually their entire population. The infrastructure decayed, and the Christian nobles and landlords fell into arrears. Strapped for cash, many of the Valencian nobles increased rents on their Christian tenants to get even close to their previous income. The increase in rents drove off any new tenants from coming to replace them. As a result, agricultural output in Valencia dropped greatly.

The expulsion was a crippling blow to the economies of Aragon and Valencia, and the power of their nobles. The former Crown of Aragon had been in the shadow of the richer and more populous Crown of Castile for some time, but with this, their stature dropped still further. Of the eastern kingdoms, the Catalan nobles now rose to prominence, their incomes far less affected since, unlike their southern and western neighbors, they never had significant Morisco populations. The expulsion helped shift power away from its traditional centers in Valencia to the Principality of Catalonia within the Crown of Aragon.

== Modern initiatives ==
In reaction to the policy of Spain to facilitate access to Spanish citizenship by descendants of the Jews who were expelled from Spain, there have been requests from Muslims to apply a similar policy to the descendants of the Moriscos. In 2006, this demand received support from the parliament of Andalusia; however, it has since failed to gain broader support.

== See also ==
- Decline of Spain
- Persecution of Muslims
- Treaty of Granada (1491)
- Alhambra Decree
- Edict of Expulsion
- Edict of Fontainebleau
- 1731 Expulsion of Protestants from Salzburg
- Tétouan
- Tangier-Tétouan-Al Hoceima
  - Tétouan
  - Tangier
- Republic of Salé
  - Rabat
