= Henri Lapeyre =

French historian and hispanist

Henri Lapeyre (1910 - 10 March 1984) was a French historian and Hispanist, specialist in the modern history of Spain. He was professor of modern history at the University of Grenoble.

== Selected works ==
- Une Famille de marchands : Les Ruiz. Contribution a l'étude du commerce entre la France et l'Espagne au temps de Philippe II Éditions de l'École des Hautes Études en Sciences ISBN 2-7132-0480-1 edición original 1955
- Simon Ruiz et Les asientos De Philippe II ed. Ehess
- Simón Ruiz en Medina del Campo. 1525-1597.Cámara de Comercio e Industria de Valladolid, 1990, Valladolid.
- La Taula de Cambis (en la vida económica de Valencia a mediados del reinado de Felipe II) 1982
- El comercio exterior de Castilla a través de las aduanas de Felipe II (Estudios y documentos)1981 Universidad de Valladolid, Facultad de Filosofía y Letras
- Ensayos de historiografía 1978 Facultad de Filosofía y Letras, Universidad de Valladolid
- La Trata de negros con destino a la América Española Durante Los últimos años del reinado de Carlos V. 1544-1555 Separata del Cuaderno de Investigación Histórica. Madrid, 1978
- Carlos Quinto Col. ¿Qué sé? N.º 65 Ediciones Oikos-tau (1972)
- Las monarquías europeas del siglo XVI : las relaciones internacionales Barcelona, España : Labor, 1969
- Géographie de l'Espagne morisque 1959
