= Jalance =

- Municipality
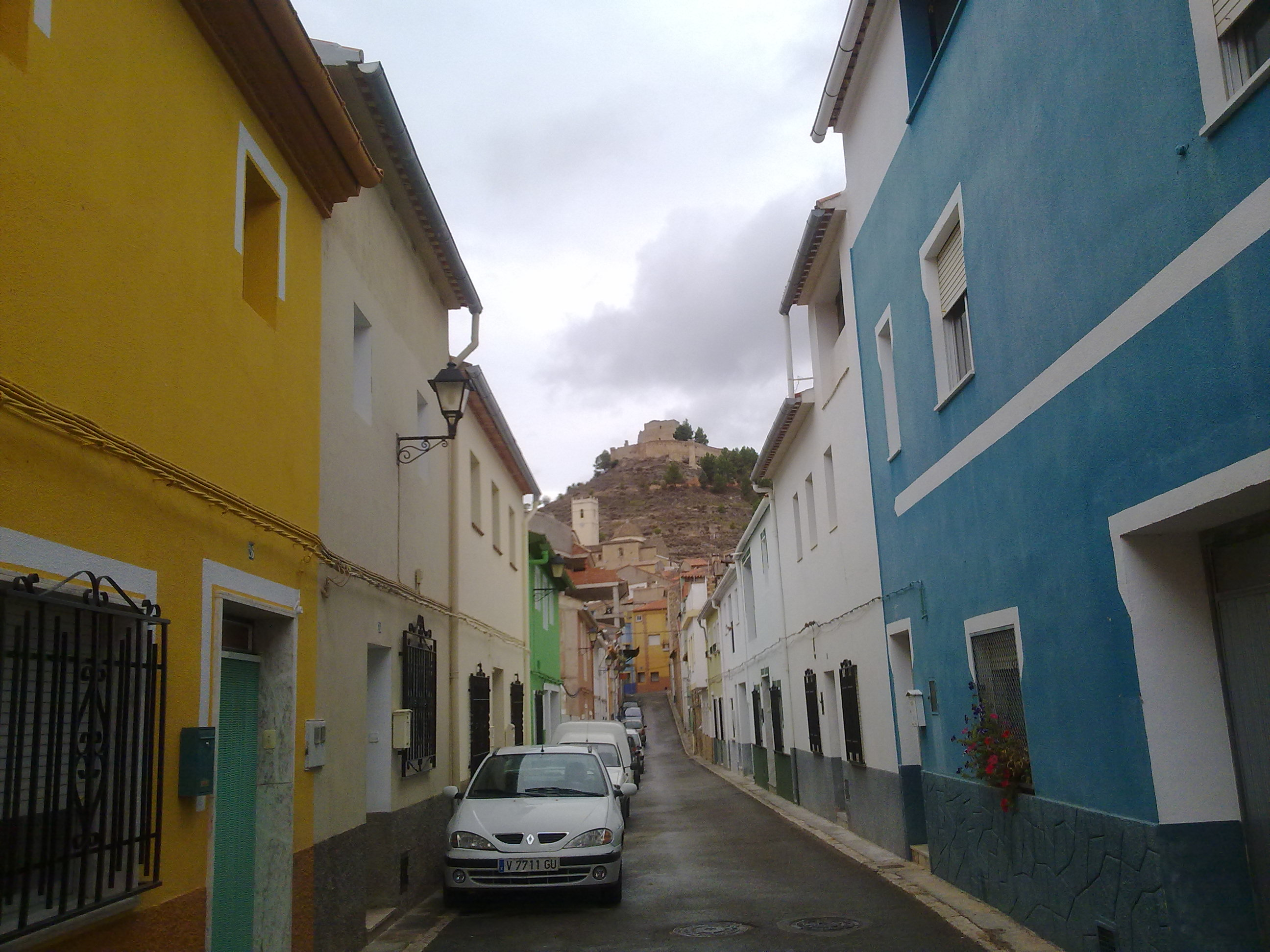

- Coat of arms

- Location in Spain
- Coordinates: 39°11′32″N 1°4′36″W
- Country: Spain
- Autonomous community: Valencian Community
- Province: Valencia
- Comarca: Valle de Cofrentes
- Judicial district: Requena

Government
  - Alcalde: Ángel Abel Navarro Navarro (PP)

Area
  - Total: 94.80 km^{2} (36.60 sq mi)
- Elevation: 453 m (1,486 ft)

Population (2025-01-01)
  - Total: 808
  - Density: 8.52/km^{2} (22.1/sq mi)
- Demonym: Jalancino/a
- Time zone: UTC+1 (CET)
  - Summer (DST): UTC+2 (CEST)
- Postal code: 46624
- Official language(s): Spanish
- Website: Official website

Jalance is a municipality in the comarca of Valle de Cofrentes in the Valencian Community, Spain. As of 1 January 2022, the population is 788 people.

== See also ==
- List of municipalities in Valencia
