= Zarra, Spain =

Zarra
- Municipality
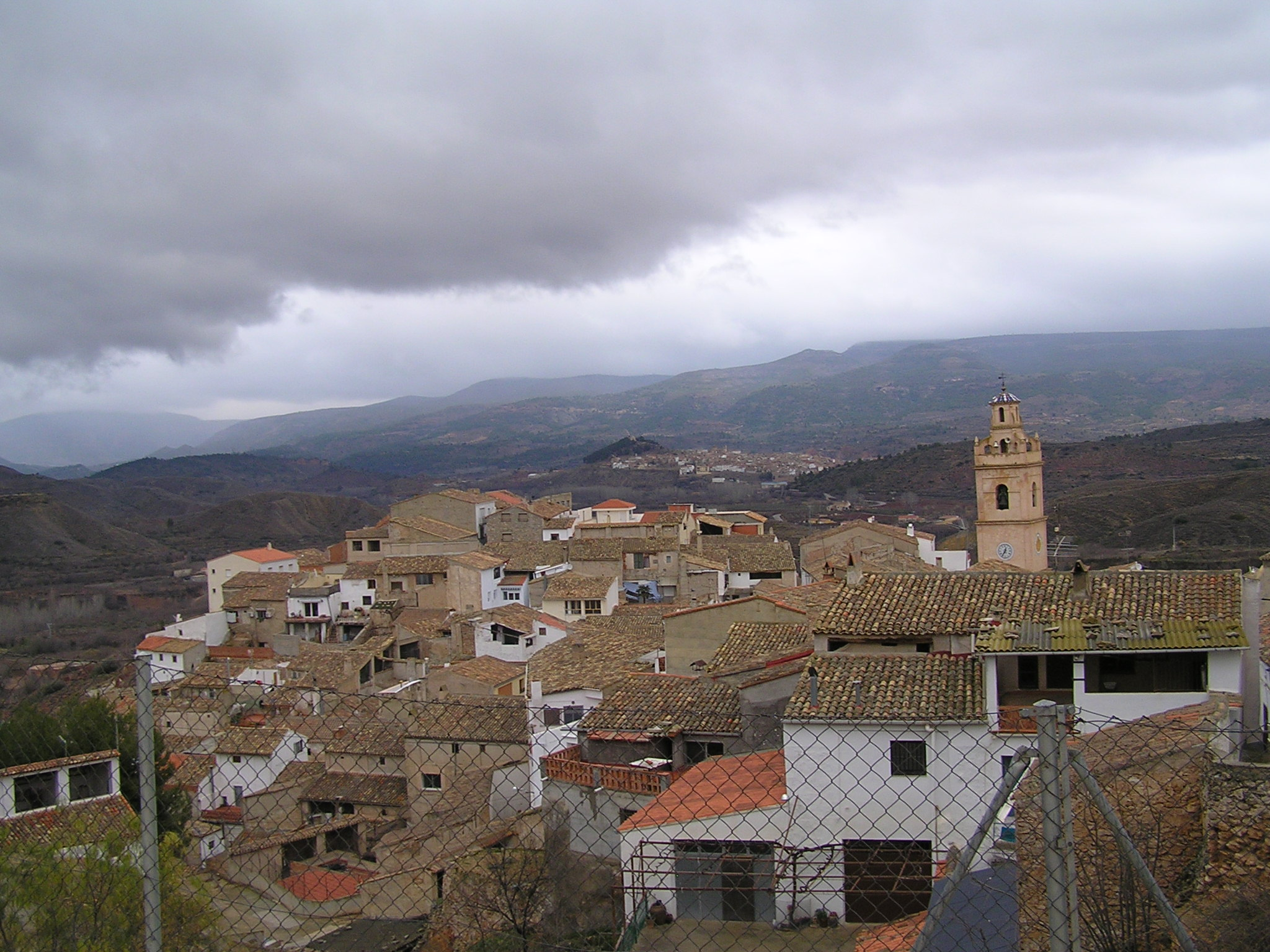

- Flag Coat of arms

- Location in Spain
- Coordinates: 39°5′30″N 1°4′36″W
- Country: Spain
- Autonomous community: Valencian Community
- Province: Valencia
- Comarca: Valle de Ayora Cofrentes
- Judicial district: Requena

Government
  - Alcalde: Raúl Martínez Martínez (PSOE)

Area
  - Total: 49.72 km^{2} (19.20 sq mi)
- Elevation: 605 m (1,985 ft)

Population (2022)
  - Total: 615
  - Density: 12.4/km^{2} (32.0/sq mi)
- Demonym: Zarrino/a
- Time zone: UTC+1 (CET)
  - Summer (DST): UTC+2 (CEST)
- Postal code: 46621
- Official language(s): Spanish
- Website: Official website

Zarra is a municipality in the Valencian Community, Spain, the smallest of the seven villages that make up the comarca of Valle de Cofrentes.

== Historical Interest ==
The name is of Iberian origin and means "the old".

The village contains a church dating back to the 18th century and a free standing clock tower built in 1880. The majority of the houses date back 400 years.

During the Moorish occupation of Spain a castle was built, but no remains exist today and the exact site is somewhat of a mystery. The village was reconquered by the Spanish in 1249 and incorporated into Valencia in 1281. Modern day Zarra dates from around 1600.

== Modern Zarra ==
The village has a population of around 500, recent population increases being mainly due to the British influx into the village and surrounding area.

== Fiestas ==
Zarra boasts three fiestas a year, marking the beginning of the fiestas within the valley. The first being San Anton (January), Santa Ana (July) and the main yearly "bull" fiesta (late July/August).

== Local industry ==
The main industry for the village is agriculture, in particular the growing of cherries and olives.

== See also ==
- List of municipalities in Valencia
