= Jarafuel =

- Municipality
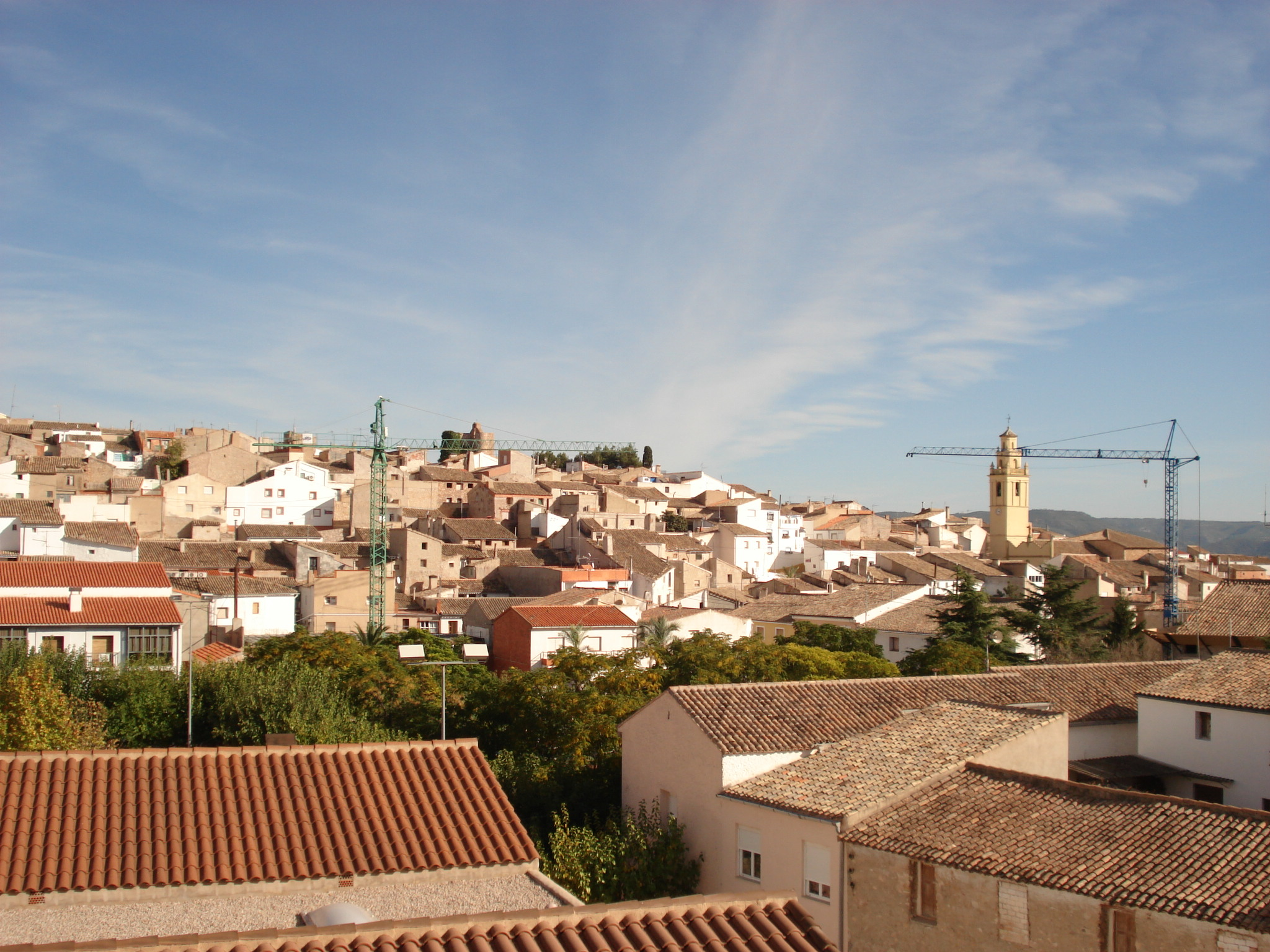

- Coat of arms

- Location in Spain
- Coordinates: 39°8′20″N 1°4′26″W
- Country: Spain
- Autonomous community: Valencian Community
- Province: Valencia
- Comarca: Valle de Cofrentes
- Judicial district: Requena

Area
  - Total: 103.10 km^{2} (39.81 sq mi)
- Elevation: 650 m (2,130 ft)

Population (2025-01-01)
  - Total: 788
  - Density: 7.64/km^{2} (19.8/sq mi)
- Demonym: Jarafuelino/a
- Time zone: UTC+1 (CET)
  - Summer (DST): UTC+2 (CEST)
- Postal code: 46623
- Official language(s): Spanish
- Website: Official website

Jarafuel (Valencian: Xarafull) is a municipality in the comarca of Valle de Cofrentes in the Valencian Community, Spain. As of 1 January 2022, the population is 777 people.

== See also ==
- List of municipalities in Valencia
