= Evaristo Crespo Azorín =

Evaristo Crespo Azorín (27 January 1863 in Ayora, Valencia Province, Spain – 6 March 1941 in the city of Valencia) was a Spanish lawyer, politician and professor. He is buried in Valencia's Municipal Cemetery.

== Career ==
Evaristo was the cousin of Enrique Crespo Aparicio, who was admitted to the Bar Association of Valencia before him, in 1880, beginning the saga of Crespo & Azorin in that institution.

Lacking the financial wherewithal to study, he went to Madrid and worked in a pharmacy as a youth, using his spare time to study. He graduated in Pharmaceutical Science and Law, which he finished at the age of 21, and later in Arts and as a Professor of Commerce. He approached the Conservative Party founded by Antonio Cánovas del Castillo and went to Valencia to practice law, which earned him a reputation. When he was 28 years old, in 1891, he was elected municipal councillor in the city, holding the post of Deputy Mayor and by the age of 31 was already a provincial deputy. Fourteen years later, in the elections of 21 April 1907, he became a Member of Parliament for the Chelva-Villar district and in the 8 May 1910 elections for the Alzira-Carcaixent district.

Antonio Maura, the then Head of Government, made him responsible for the drafting and defense of the Draft Law of Local Government and the defense also of the Mortgage Act of 1909 and two very specific and favorable opinions for the city of Valencia as were the granting of the lagoon and the introduction of the railroad through Cuenca, between Valencia and the capital Madrid.

After the events known as Tragic Week in Barcelona, he was appointed Civil Governor of that province. He spent a short time in Barcelona, where he was supposed to resolve the problems involving Angel Ossorio y Gallardo, a member of his own party, who had been accused of weakness before the events of 1909. Like Ossorio y Gallardo, Crespo Azorín remained loyal to the party to which both belonged, and when the party split between the followers of Eduardo Dato and Antonio Maura, both decided to support the latter. However, after heading the Barcelona province, he returned to Valencia, for his task of teaching and lawyer was in this city.

Despite his political passion, he did not leave at any time to study and teach, while still being a lawyer in body and soul. He had also graduated in Philosophy at the University of Valencia, Calle de la Nave and graduated as a professor in the Commercial Trade School in Alicante, because there was no such centre in Valencia, even before all political activity he had won the chair of Comparative Commercial Law, Economics and Law of Customs of the School of Commerce. To practice in Valencia he founded the centre that bore his name due to him having been the first director of the Business School that existed in the Barrio del Carmen in Valencia, later being appointed honorary director. The Business School later created a chair that bore his name.

This creation had been conducted under the auspices of Ateneo Mercantil de Valencia, where he became vice president and left a trail that went with the familiar presence at the cloister.

He dedicated himself mostly to law, creating a special style of exercising the profession which he started as an intern in the counsel Facundo Burriel Guillen and his predicament led him to proclaim the year of the Second Republic, to take the Dean of the Valencian Lawyer's College (from 1919 to 1923 he served as deputy 2nd and from 1925 to 1927 the office of deputy 1), a post he held for one term and with such prestige that he was appointed Honorary Dean Perpetual of the College professional. He was counsel in many companies of the first magnitude, such as the Central of Aragon, Valencia ditches, Trams and Railways Company of Valencia (CTFV) and several banks, which did not stop his political activity, especially in the time he also served as a Valencia councillor.

Streets in Valencia city are named after Crespo Azorín.

== Sources ==
- El Archivo Histórico del Colegio de Abogados de Valencia, ICAV.
- Enciclopedia de la Región Valenciana
- 101 hijos ilustres del Reino de Valencia, por Vicente Añon.
- Cien abogados ilustres del Colegio de Valencia, por Francisco de P. Momblanch y Gonzalbez, editado por el ICAV en el año 1961.
