= Cabriel =

River in Albacete, Spain

Coordinates: 39°14′15″N 1°04′57″W

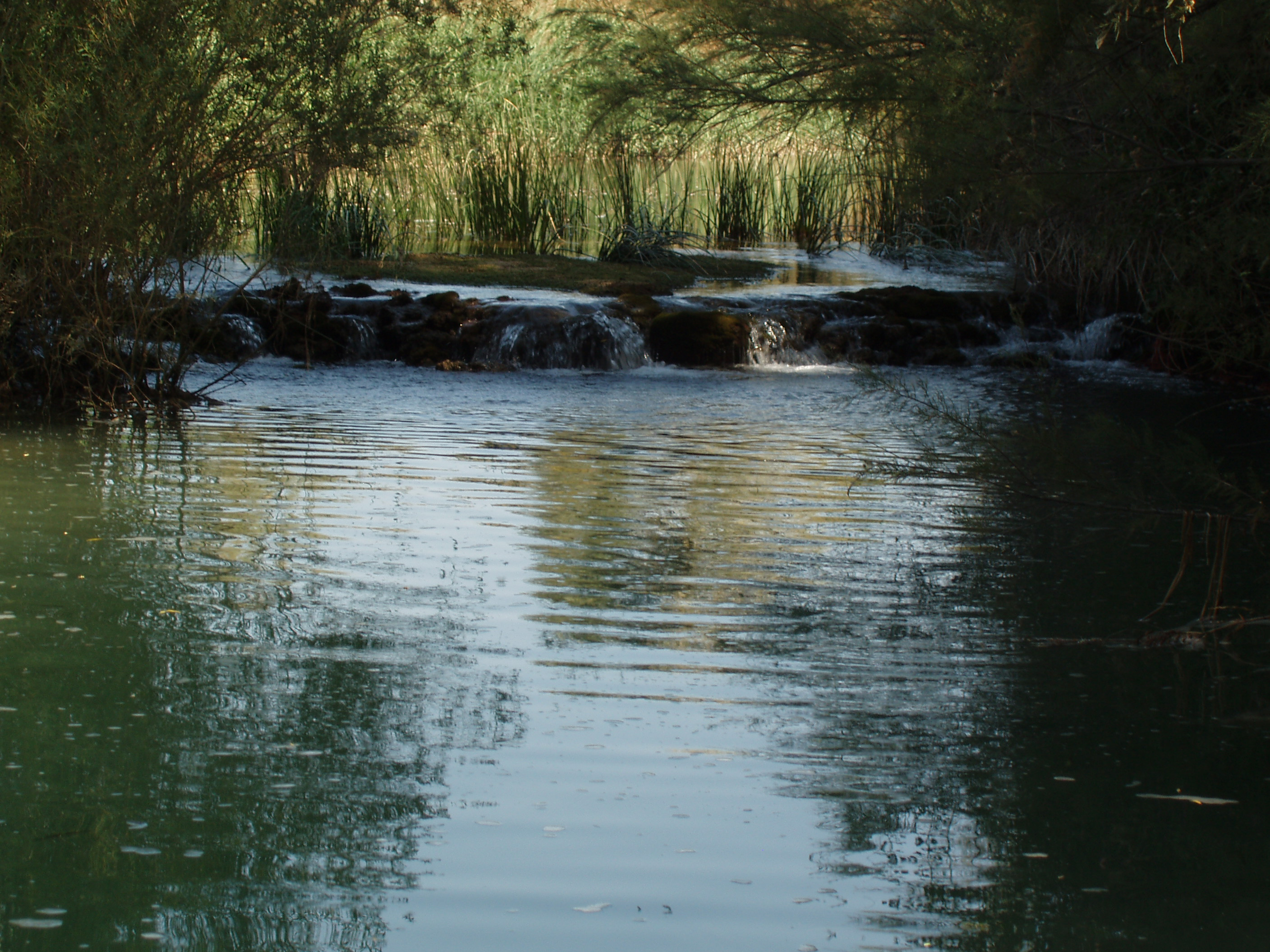
Cabriel River

Cabriel (Spanish: [kaˈβɾjel]) or Cabriol (Valencian: [kabɾiˈɔl]) is a tributary of the Júcar River in the province of Albacete, Spain. It has its source in the Montes Universales.

== See also ==
- List of rivers of Spain
