= Teresa de Cofrentes =

- Municipality
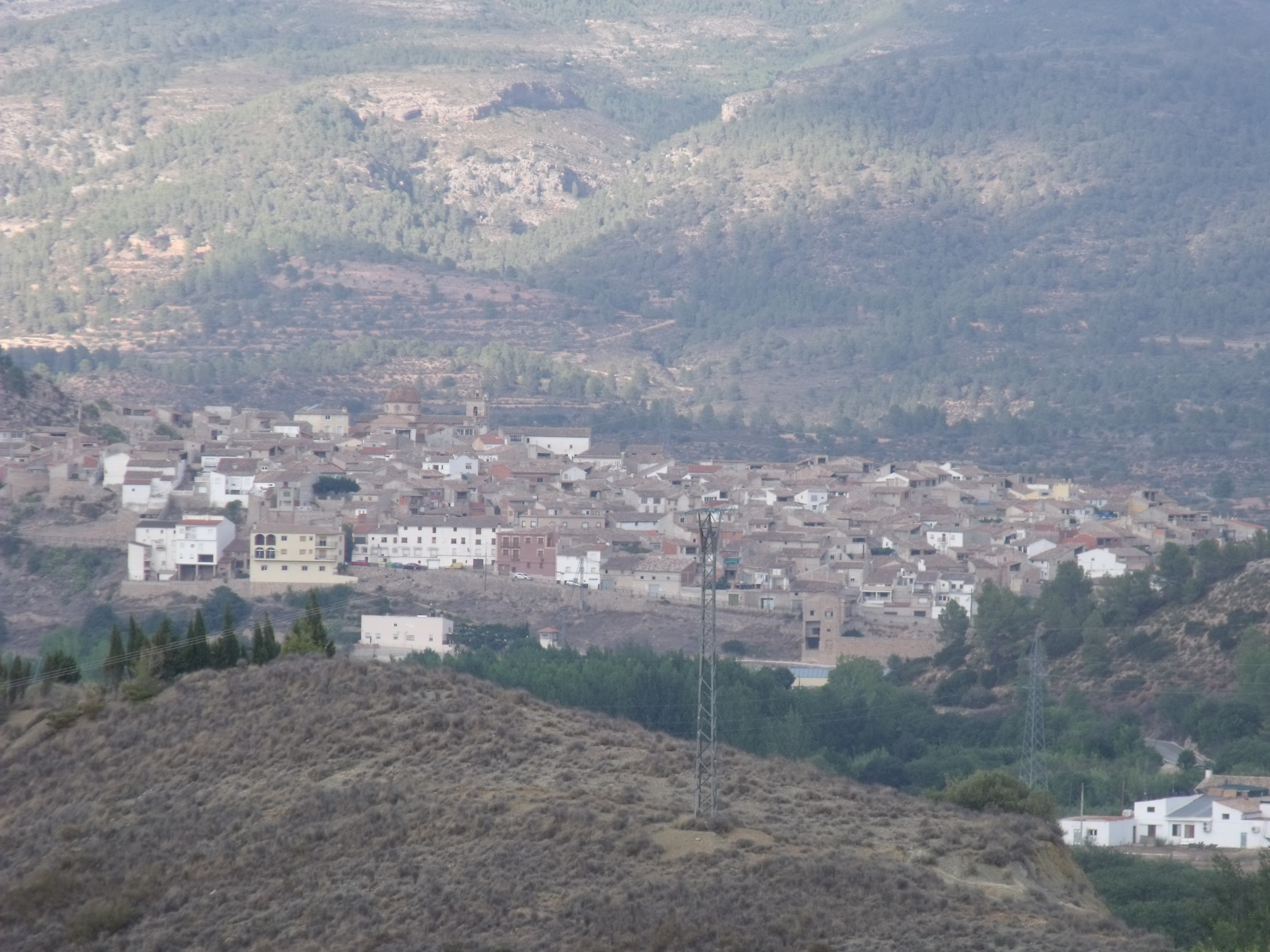

- Coat of arms

- Location in Spain
- Coordinates: 39°6′20″N 1°3′6″W
- Country: Spain
- Autonomous community: Valencian Community
- Province: Valencia
- Comarca: Valle de Ayora Cofrentes
- Judicial district: Requena

Government
  - Alcalde: Francisco Cebrián Gómez (PSOE)

Area
  - Total: 110.80 km^{2} (42.78 sq mi)
- Elevation: 533 m (1,749 ft)

Population (2025-01-01)
  - Total: 620
  - Density: 5.6/km^{2} (14/sq mi)
- Demonym: Teresino/a
- Time zone: UTC+1 (CET)
  - Summer (DST): UTC+2 (CEST)
- Postal code: 46622
- Official language(s): Spanish
- Website: Official website

Teresa de Cofrentes is a municipality in the comarca of Valle de Cofrentes in the Valencian Community, Spain. As of 1 January 2022, the population is 615 people.

== See also ==
- List of municipalities in Valencia
