= Cortes-La Muela Reservoir =

Hydroelectric dam in Spain

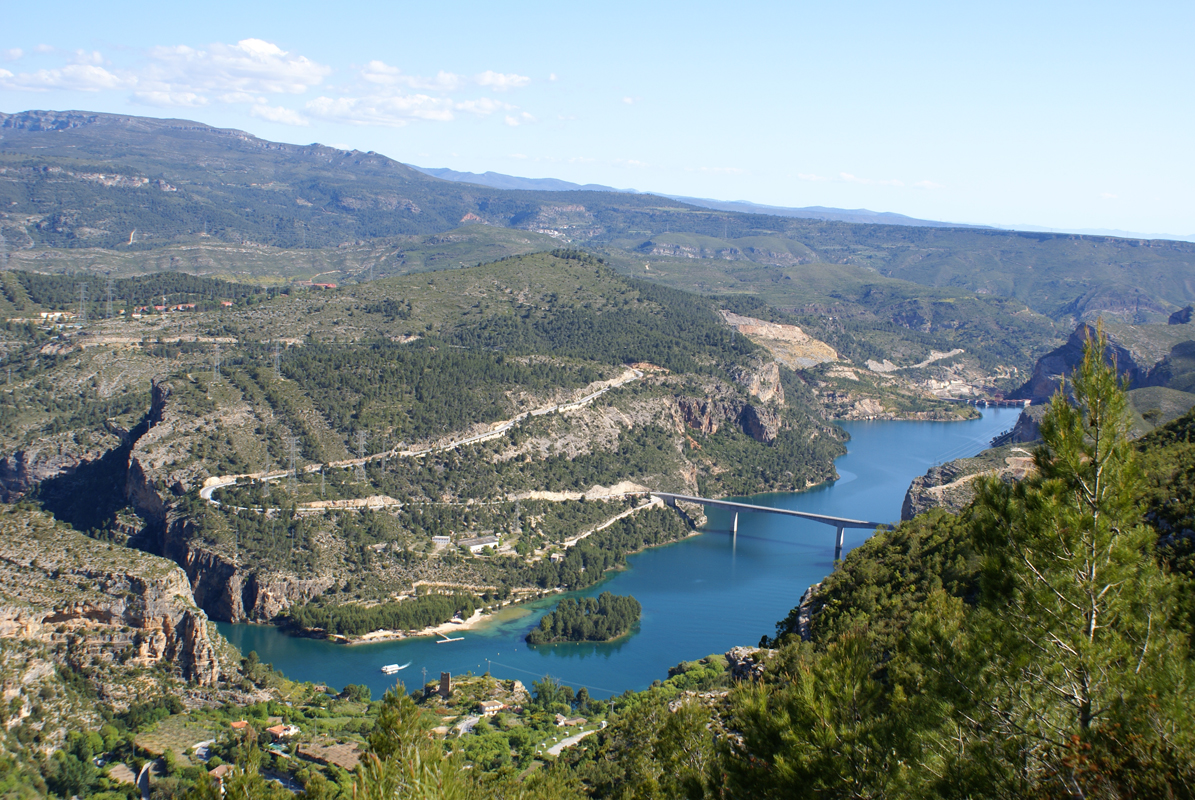
- View from the Cortes de Pallás Muela.
- Interactive map of Cortes-La Muela Reservoir
- Location: Valencia, Valencian Community, Spain
- Coordinates: 39°14′16″N 0°55′40″W
- Purpose: Hydroelectric and tourist
- Status: Operational
- Construction began: 1983
- Opening date: 1988; 2013 (Expansion)
- Construction cost: €1.2 billion
- Owner: Iberdrola

Dam and spillways
- Type of dam: Arch dam
- Impounds: Júcar River
- Height: 116 m (381 ft)
- Length: 312 m (1,024 ft)
- Elevation at crest: 332 m (1,089 ft)

Reservoir
- Creates: Cortes Reservoir
- Total capacity: Reservoir: 116 hm^{3} (94,000 acre⋅ft); Upper: 23 hm^{3} (19,000 acre⋅ft)
- Catchment area: 17,149 km^{2} (6,621 sq mi)
- Surface area: 115 ha (0.44 sq mi)

Power Station
- Operator: Iberdrola
- Commission date: 1988 (Cortes II); 1988 (La Muela I); 2013 (La Muela II)
- Type: Conventional (C II); Pumped-storage (LM I & II)
- Turbines: 2 Francis R (C II); 3 Francis L (LM I); 4 Francis L (LM II)
- Installed capacity: 290.5 MW (389,600 hp) (C II); 634.8 MW (851,300 hp) (LM I); 881.73 MW (1,182,420 hp) (LM II)
- Annual generation: 5,000 GWh (18,000 TJ)

Cortes-La Muela Reservoir (sometimes referred to as Cortes II Reservoir) is an arch dam and hydroelectric project built on the mid-course of the Júcar River, located in the town of Cortes de Pallás, within the province of Valencia, in the Valencian Community, Spain.

As of 2018, it was the largest pumped hydroelectric storage plant in Europe. The project comprises a dam and large reservoir, a conventional hydroelectric power station and two underground pumped-storage hydroelectric power stations that, together, generate approximately 5,000 GWh (18,000 TJ) per annum.

== Description ==
The Cortes Reservoir and dam, together with La Muela I hydroelectric power station, were built between 1983 and 1988. The pumped-storage hydroelectric power station has an installed capacity of 630 megawatts (840,000 hp) for generation and 540 megawatts (720,000 hp) for pumping.

Later, between 2006 and 2013, La Muela II pumped-storage power station was constructed, with an installed capacity of 850 megawatts (1,140,000 hp) for generation and 740 megawatts (990,000 hp) for pumping. This established the complex as a major hydroelectric facility within the Iberian Peninsula, with 1,520 megawatts (2,040,000 hp) in pumping capacity. The reservoir covers an area of 115 hectares (280 acres) and has a capacity of 116 cubic hectometres (94,000 acre⋅ft). The combined facilities were estimated to cost €1.2 billion.

The complex comprises three hydroelectric power stations: the conventional station located at the foot of Cortes II Dam, La Muela I, and La Muela II. The distinctive feature of La Muela II is that it was designed to use electricity at night and generate it during the day. At night, when electricity demand is low, water is pumped from Cortes Reservoir up to La Muela Storage Basin using surplus electricity from the grid, as electricity production at night exceeds consumption.

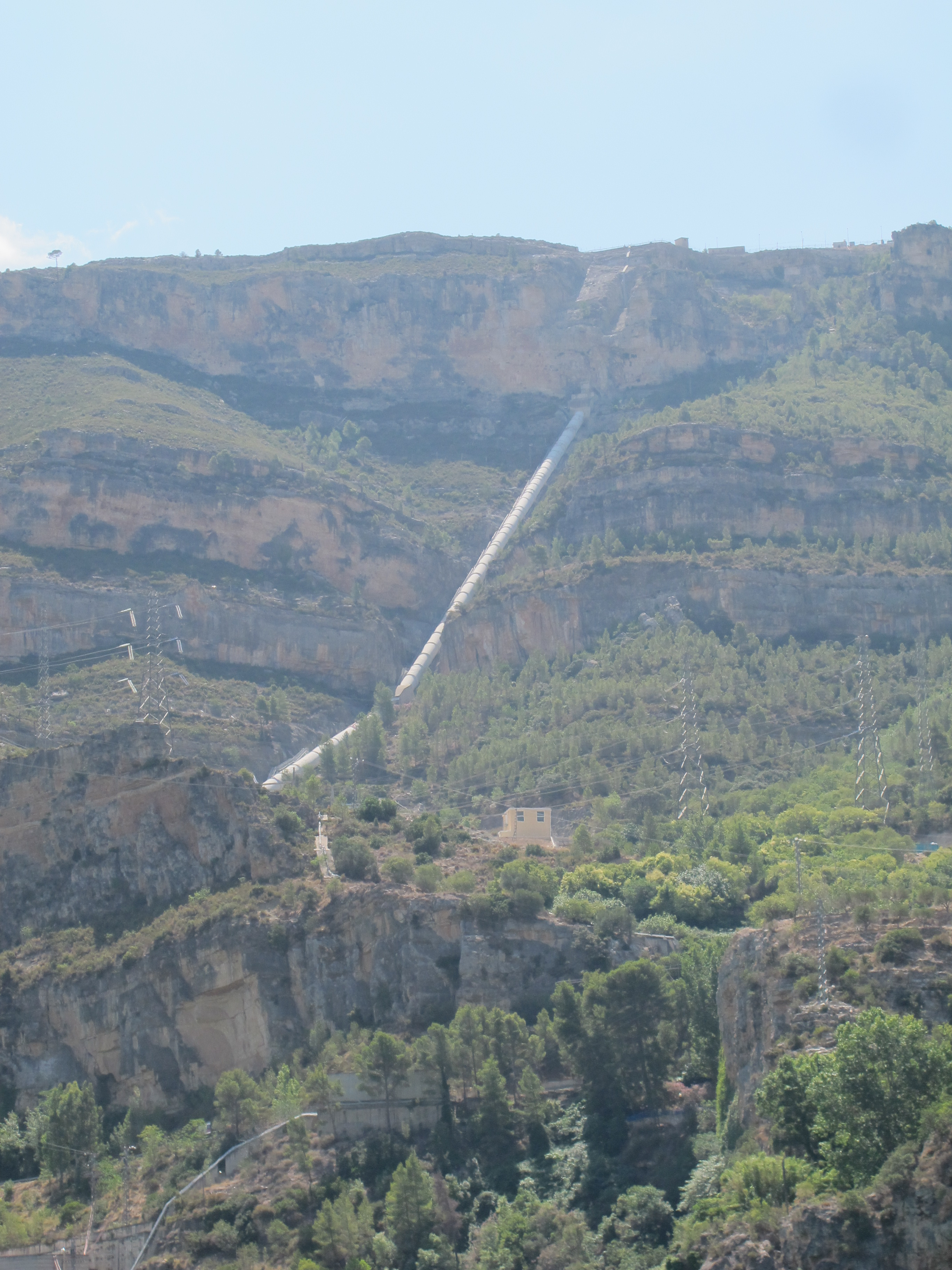
The pipeline from the upper storage basin down to the lower reservoir, 524 m (1,719 ft) below.

During the day, when households and businesses consume more electricity, the water is released through turbines, falling 524 metres (1,719 ft) from the storage basin back down to the reservoir, producing clean electricity. In 2022, due to the rapid growth of photovoltaic energy, electricity surpluses began to occur during the central hours of the day, meaning that most pumping is now carried out at that time.

La Muela II power station is located inside an underground cavern measuring 115 metres (377 ft) long, 50 metres (160 ft) high, and 20 metres (66 ft) wide; larger than Valencia Cathedral. La Muela II has a 840-metre-long (2,760 ft) penstock that is 5.45 metres (17.9 ft) in diameter, with an intake in the 23-cubic-hectometre (19,000 acre⋅ft) upper reservoir, an underground plant to house the equipment and a suction area in the lower reservoir.

The current reservoir and power station facility replaced an earlier power station dating from the 1920s, known as Cortes Hydroelectric Power Station, or Rambla Seca. It was demolished in 1988 once the new facilities were operational.

== See also ==
- List of dams and reservoirs in Spain
- Renewable energy in Spain
