= Isidro Ayora, Ecuador =

Isidro Ayora
- Town
- Location within Ecuador
- Coordinates: 1.88091°S 80.14415°W
- Country: Ecuador
- Province: Guayas Province
- Canton: Isidro Ayora Canton

Area
  - Town: 2.38 km^{2} (0.92 sq mi)

Population (2022 census)
  - Town: 8,275
  - Density: 3,480/km^{2} (9,010/sq mi)

Isidro Ayora (formerly known as Soledad) is a town located in central Guayas, Ecuador. It is named after Isidro Ayora, a former Ecuadorian president. It is the seat of the canton of Isidro Ayora, the newest canton in the province, created in 1996.

At the 2022 census Isidro Ayora Canton had a population of 14,305.

The main crops are rice, maize, mango, and watermelon.

== Climate ==
Climate data for Isidro Aroya, elevation 20 m (66 ft), (1961–1990)
Month	Jan	Feb	Mar	Apr	May	Jun	Jul	Aug	Sep	Oct	Nov	Dec	Year
Mean daily maximum °C (°F)	31.2 (88.2)	31.1 (88.0)	31.2 (88.2)	32.0 (89.6)	31.6 (88.9)	30.6 (87.1)	30.6 (87.1)	31.3 (88.3)	32.2 (90.0)	32.0 (89.6)	31.7 (89.1)	32.5 (90.5)	31.5 (88.7)
Daily mean °C (°F)	25.6 (78.1)	25.5 (77.9)	25.7 (78.3)	25.8 (78.4)	25.6 (78.1)	24.7 (76.5)	24.2 (75.6)	24.7 (76.5)	24.7 (76.5)	25.1 (77.2)	25.1 (77.2)	25.7 (78.3)	25.2 (77.4)
Mean daily minimum °C (°F)	21.2 (70.2)	20.7 (69.3)	20.8 (69.4)	21.0 (69.8)	20.2 (68.4)	19.2 (66.6)	18.0 (64.4)	19.0 (66.2)	19.2 (66.6)	19.2 (66.6)	19.5 (67.1)	20.2 (68.4)	19.8 (67.8)
Average precipitation mm (inches)	200.0 (7.87)	207.0 (8.15)	256.0 (10.08)	115.0 (4.53)	57.0 (2.24)	20.0 (0.79)	1.0 (0.04)	1.0 (0.04)	2.0 (0.08)	3.0 (0.12)	2.0 (0.08)	48.0 (1.89)	912 (35.91)
Source: FAO
