= Cofrentes =

- Municipality
- Flag Coat of arms

- Location in Spain Cofrentes (Valencian Community) Cofrentes (Spain)
- Coordinates: 39°13′47″N 1°3′41″W
- Country: Spain
- Autonomous community: Valencian Community
- Province: Valencia
- Comarca: Valle de Ayora Cofrentes
- Judicial district: Requena

Government
  - Alcalde: Salvador Honrubia Mora (C´s)

Area
  - Total: 103.2 km^{2} (39.8 sq mi)
- Elevation: 437 m (1,434 ft)

Population (2022)
  - Total: 1,112
  - Density: 10.78/km^{2} (27.91/sq mi)
- Demonym(s): cofrentino,a
- Time zone: UTC+1 (CET)
  - Summer (DST): UTC+2 (CEST)
- Postal code: 46625
- Official language(s): Spanish
- Website: Official website

Cofrentes (Valencian: Cofrents) is a town in the province of Valencia.

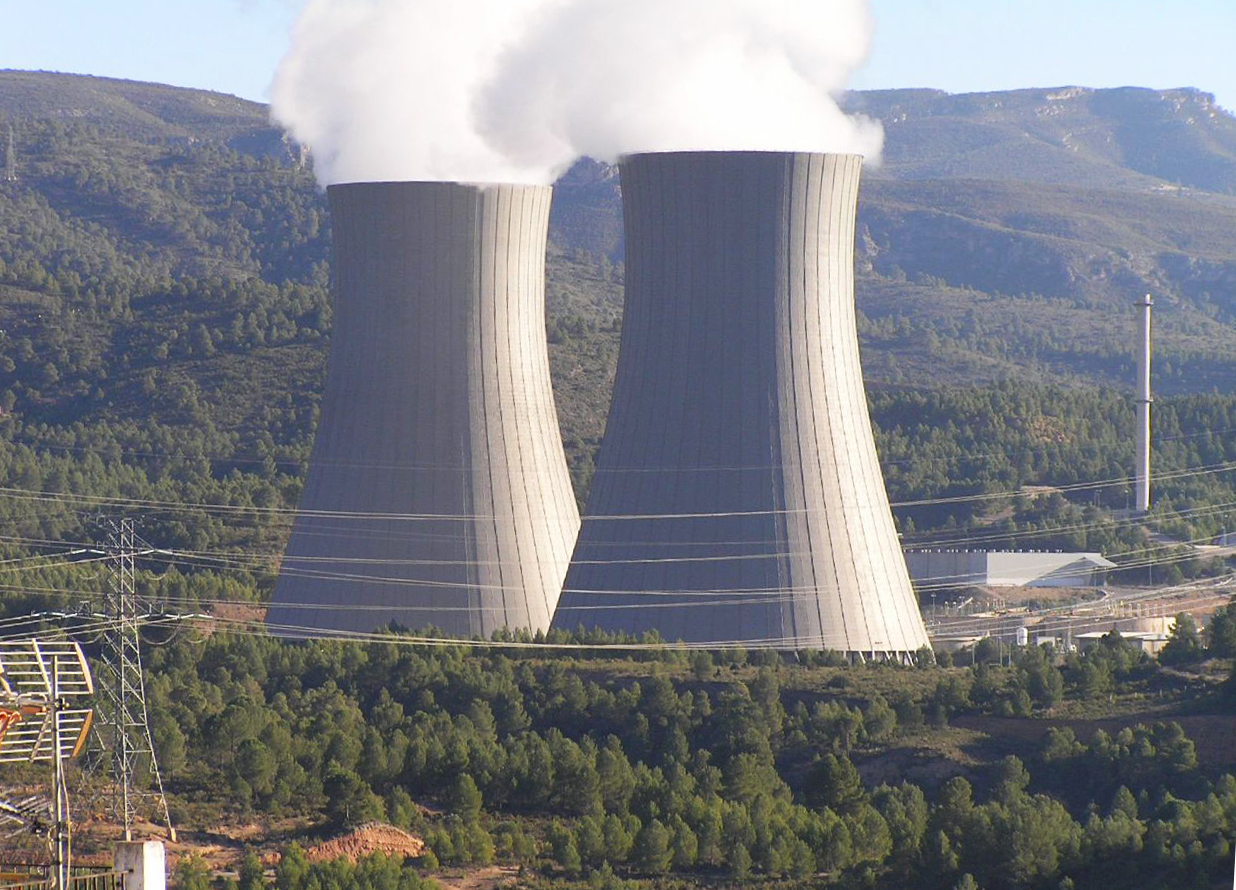
Cofrentes nuclear power plant cooling towers

There is a nuclear power plant in Cofrentes.

== See also ==
- List of municipalities in Valencia
