= Isidro Ayora Canton =

- Canton
- Location of Guayas in Ecuador.

- Isidro Ayora Canton in Guayas Province
- Coordinates: 1°53′S 80°10′W
- Country: Ecuador
- Province: Guayas Province
- Capital: Isidro Ayora

Area
  - Total: 492 km^{2} (190 sq mi)

Population (2022 census)
  - Total: 14,305
  - Density: 29.1/km^{2} (75.3/sq mi)
- Time zone: UTC-5 (ECT)

Isidro Ayora Canton is a canton of Ecuador, located in the Guayas Province. Its capital is the town of Isidro Ayora. Its population at the 2001 census was 8,226.

== Demographics ==
Ethnic groups as of the Ecuadorian census of 2010:

- Mestizo 55.5%
- Montubio 32.4%
- Afro-Ecuadorian 9.0%
- White 2.9%
- Indigenous 0.1%
- Other 0.1%
