= Tragacete =

Tragacete, Spain
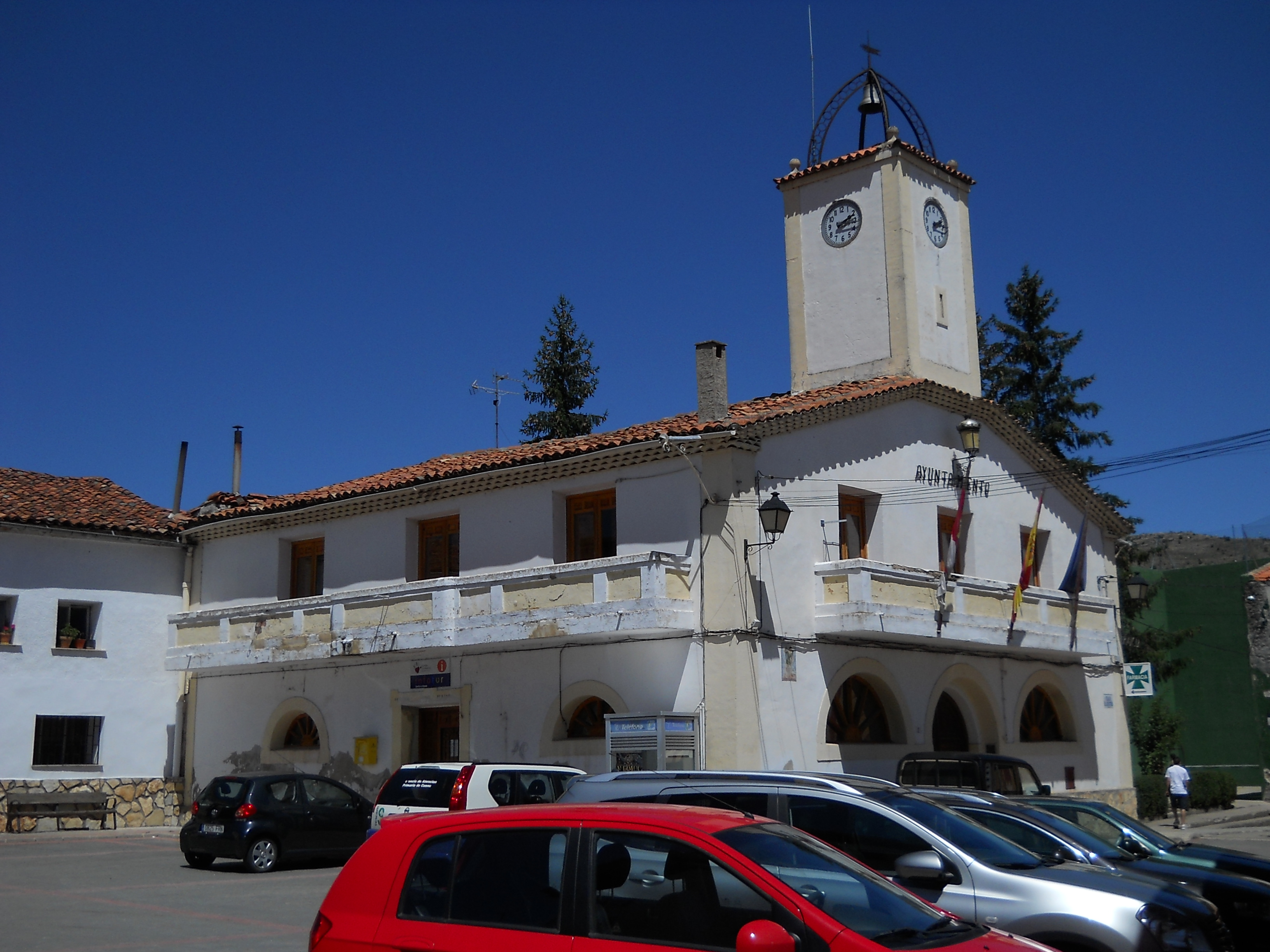
- Tragacete Local Council

- Flag Coat of arms

- Location within Spain Location within Castilla-La Mancha
- Coordinates: 40°21′N 1°51′W
- Country: Spain
- Autonomous community: Castile-La Mancha
- Province: Cuenca
- Municipality: Tragacete

Area
  - Total: 61 km^{2} (24 sq mi)

Population (2025-01-01)
  - Total: 263
  - Density: 4.3/km^{2} (11/sq mi)
- Time zone: UTC+1 (CET)
  - Summer (DST): UTC+2 (CEST)

Tragacete is a municipality located in the province of Cuenca, Castile-La Mancha, Spain. According to the 2004 census (INE), the municipality has a population of 356 inhabitants.
