= Modern history of Spain =

Articles on the modern history of Spain:

- Early Modern history of Spain
  - Habsburg Spain (16th to 17th centuries) / Spanish Golden Age (1500-1681)
    - 17th-century Spain
  - Bourbon Spain (18th century)
- 19th-century Spain
  - History of Spain (1814–73)
- Restoration (Spain) (1874–1931)
- 20th-century Spain
  - Second Spanish Republic (1931–1939)
  - Francoist Spain (1936–1975)
- History of Spain (1975–present)
