= Ayora =

- Municipality
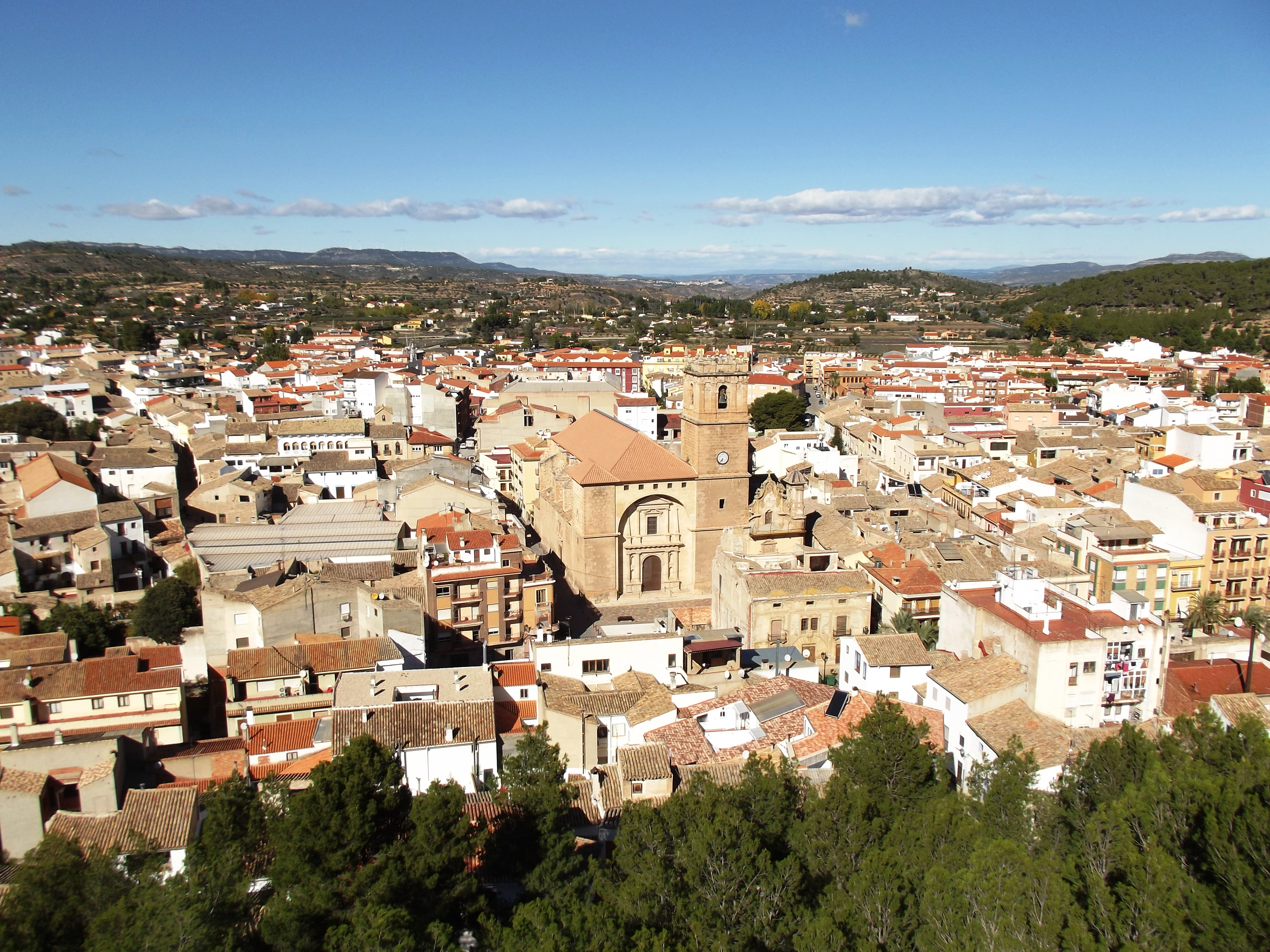
- Partial view of Ayora

- Coat of arms

- Location in Spain
- Coordinates: 39°3′30″N 1°3′26″W
- Country: Spain
- Autonomous community: Valencian Community
- Province: Valencia
- Comarca: Valle de Ayora
- Judicial district: Requena

Government
  - Alcalde: José Vicente Anaya Roig (2019-) (PP)

Area
  - Total: 446.6 km^{2} (172.4 sq mi)
- Elevation: 641 m (2,103 ft)

Population (2025-01-01)
  - Total: 5,282
  - Density: 11.83/km^{2} (30.63/sq mi)
- Demonym: Ayorenses
- Time zone: UTC+1 (CET)
  - Summer (DST): UTC+2 (CEST)
- Postal code: 46620
- Official language(s): Spanish
- Website: Official website

Ayora (Valencian: Aiora) is a municipality in the comarca of Valle de Ayora in the Valencian Community, Spain. It lies in the inland part of the Valencian Community on the border of the provinces of Albacete and Alicante.

The Valley of Ayora runs between the mountain ranges of Sierra Palomera and Mugrón to the west, and Cortes de Pallás and the Caroig Peak. Its landscape consists of numerous forest tracks crossing the valleys and bordering the mountains. It contains a number of tourist attractions: the Cave of Don Juan, the Ayora Castle, the Parish church of Our Lady of the Ascension, Hermitages, the Iberian town of the Castellar of Meca, Cave paintings (Cueva de La Vieja), La Hunde and the rivers Cabriel and Júcar. The region contains a rich variety of fauna and flora and resembles a typical landscape of inland Mediterranean zones.

== Gastronomy ==
The gastronomy of Ayora include Gazpacho Ayorino, a local variety of gazpacho and local paellas which consist of a combination of a variety of seafood and animal meat such as chicken or rabbit.

== Notable people ==
- Evaristo Crespo Azorín (1863–1941) was a Spanish lawyer, politician and professor

== See also ==
- List of municipalities in Valencia
