= Cortes de Pallás =

Small settlement in the Valencian Community of Spain

- Municipality
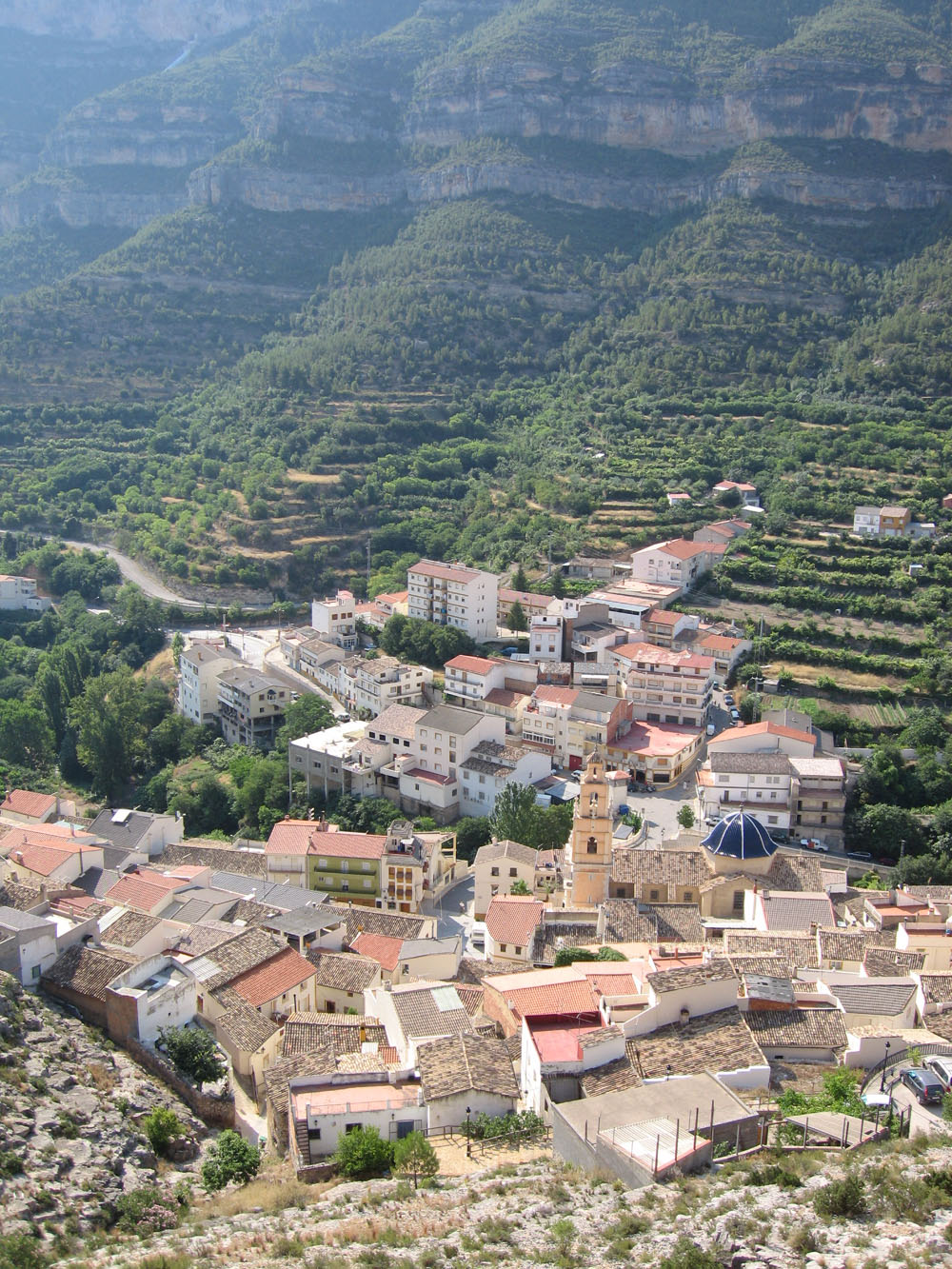

- Coat of arms

- Location in Spain
- Coordinates: 39°14′35″N 0°56′33″W
- Country: Spain
- Autonomous community: Valencian Community
- Province: Valencia
- Comarca: Valle de Cofrentes
- Judicial district: Requena

Government
  - Alcalde: Alberto Sáez (2003) (PP)

Area
  - Total: 234.63 km^{2} (90.59 sq mi)
- Elevation: 450 m (1,480 ft)

Population (2025-01-01)
  - Total: 727
  - Density: 3.10/km^{2} (8.03/sq mi)
- Demonym(s): Cortesano, na
- Time zone: UTC+1 (CET)
  - Summer (DST): UTC+2 (CEST)
- Postal code: 46199
- Official language(s): Spanish
- Website: Official website

Cortes de Pallás is a municipality in the comarca of Valle de Cofrentes in the Valencian Community, Spain. As of 1 January 2022, the population is 733 people.

The Cortes-La Muela Reservoir and associated hydroelectric power plant is located near the municipality.

== See also ==
- List of municipalities in Valencia
