= Valle de Ayora =

Coordinates: 39.1093°N 1.07734°W

Valle de Ayora Valle de Ayora-Cofrentes Vall de Cofrents
- Comarca
- Country: Spain
- Autonomous community: Valencian Community
- Province: València / Valencia
- Capital and largest city: Ayora
- Municipalities: 7 municipalities: Ayora, Cofrentes, Cortes de Pallás, Jalance, Jarafuel, Teresa de Cofrentes, Zarra

Area
  - Total: 1,141.15 km^{2} (440.60 sq mi)

Population (2006)
  - Total: 10,501
  - Density: 9.2021/km^{2} (23.833/sq mi)
- Time zone: UTC+1 (CET)
  - Summer (DST): UTC+2 (CEST)

Valle de Ayora (Spanish: [ˈbaʎe ðe aʝoˈɾa]), also known as Valle de Ayora-Cofrentes ([ˈbaʎe ðe aʝoˈɾa koˈfɾentes]), and in Valencian: Vall de Cofrents ([ˈvaʎ de koˈfɾents]), is a comarca in the province of Valencia, Valencian Community, Spain. It is part of the Spanish-speaking area in the Valencian Community.

== Municipalities ==
- Ayora
- Cofrentes
- Cortes de Pallás
- Jalance
- Jarafuel
- Teresa de Cofrentes
- Zarra

Municipalities of Valle de Ayora
