= Horta Sud =

Coordinates: 39°22′26″N 0°25′23″W

Horta Sud Huerta Sur
- Comarca
- Country: Spain
- Autonomous community: Valencian Community
- Province: València / Valencia
- Municipalities: 20 municipalities

Area
  - Total: 309.73 km^{2} (119.59 sq mi)

Population (2023)
  - Total: 482,509
  - Density: 1,557.8/km^{2} (4,034.8/sq mi)
- Demonym
- Time zone: UTC+1 (CET)
  - Summer (DST): UTC+2 (CEST)
- Most populated municipality: Torrent

Horta Sud (Valencian: [ˈɔɾta ˈsut], also [ˈɔɾtɔ ˈsut]; Spanish: Huerta Sur [ˈweɾta ˈsuɾ]) is a comarca in the province of Valencia, Valencian Community, Spain, to the south of the city.

== Geography ==
It borders, to the north with the city of Valencia and the Horta Nord, to the northwest with Camp de Túria, to the west with Hoya de Buñol and Ribera Alta, to the east with Albufera Natural Park, and to the south with Ribera Baixa and Ribera Alta.

== Municipalities ==
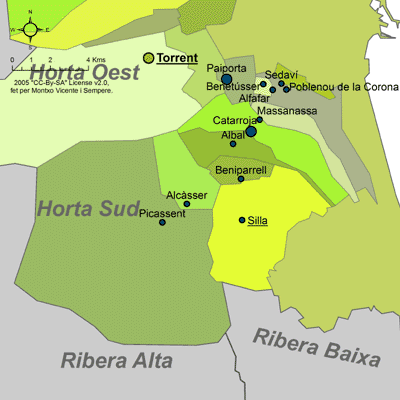
Municipalities of Horta Sud

Official name	Name in Spanish	Population (2023)	Area	Density
Torrent	Torrente	87,295	69.20	1,187.98
Mislata		45,644	2.10	20,805.24
Aldaia	Aldaya	33,376	19.90	1,601.21
Manises		31,573	16.10	1,920.43
Xirivella	Chirivella	30,749	5.20	5,696.73
Alaquàs	Alacuás	29,825	3.90	7,579.74
Catarroja		29,316	13.04	2,156.44
Paiporta		27,124	3.90	6,689.23
Quart de Poblet	Cuart de Poblet	25,590	19.70	1,256.85
Picassent	Picasent	22,236	85.78	244.14
Alfafar		21,879	10.10	2,068.32
Silla		19,683	25.00	750.84
Albal		17,024	7.40	2,216.08
Benetússer	Benetúser	15,879	0.76	21,153.84
Picanya	Picaña	11,760	7.50	1,535.07
Sedaví		10,637	1.83	5,646.45
Alcàsser	Alcácer	10,575	9.01	1,114.21
Massanassa	Masanasa	10,146	5.60	1,726.25
Beniparrell		2,074	3.70	527.57
Llocnou de la Corona	Lugar Nuevo de la Corona	124	0.0128	9,218.75
Total		482,509	309.73	1,557.84

== Language ==
Horta Sud is located within the Valencian-speaking linguistic area. Due to the arrival of numerous Spanish-speaking immigrants in the 60s and 70s, the percentage of Valencian speakers has been reduced in many municipalities. Even so, it is the sub-region with the greatest knowledge and use of Valencian in the metropolitan area of Valencia. Since 2017, 72% of the schools in Horta Sud teach entirely in Valencian.

== History ==
The Horta Sud region was created in 1989 and included part of the former Ribera Baja region and part of the historic Horta de València. These old regions appear on Emili Beüt's map of regions "Comarques naturals del Regne de València" published in 1934.

In 2023, the municipalities of the controversial Horta Oest region were officially assigned to the Horta Sud region, with the exception of Paterna, which was added to the Horta Nord region.

== October 2024 Spain floods ==
At the end of October 2024, the region suffered catastrophic flooding, and the heaviest impact in all of Spain, due to the October 2024 Spain floods, which swept away roads, bridges, cars and homes, leaving more than 200 dead and many hundreds more homeless. The heavy rains caused rivers and drainage systems to overflow, submerging entire streets and causing havoc to crops and property. The community, deeply affected, now faces the challenge of rebuilding in the midst of a humanitarian emergency.
