= Torrent, Valencia =

Torrent Torrente
- City and municipality
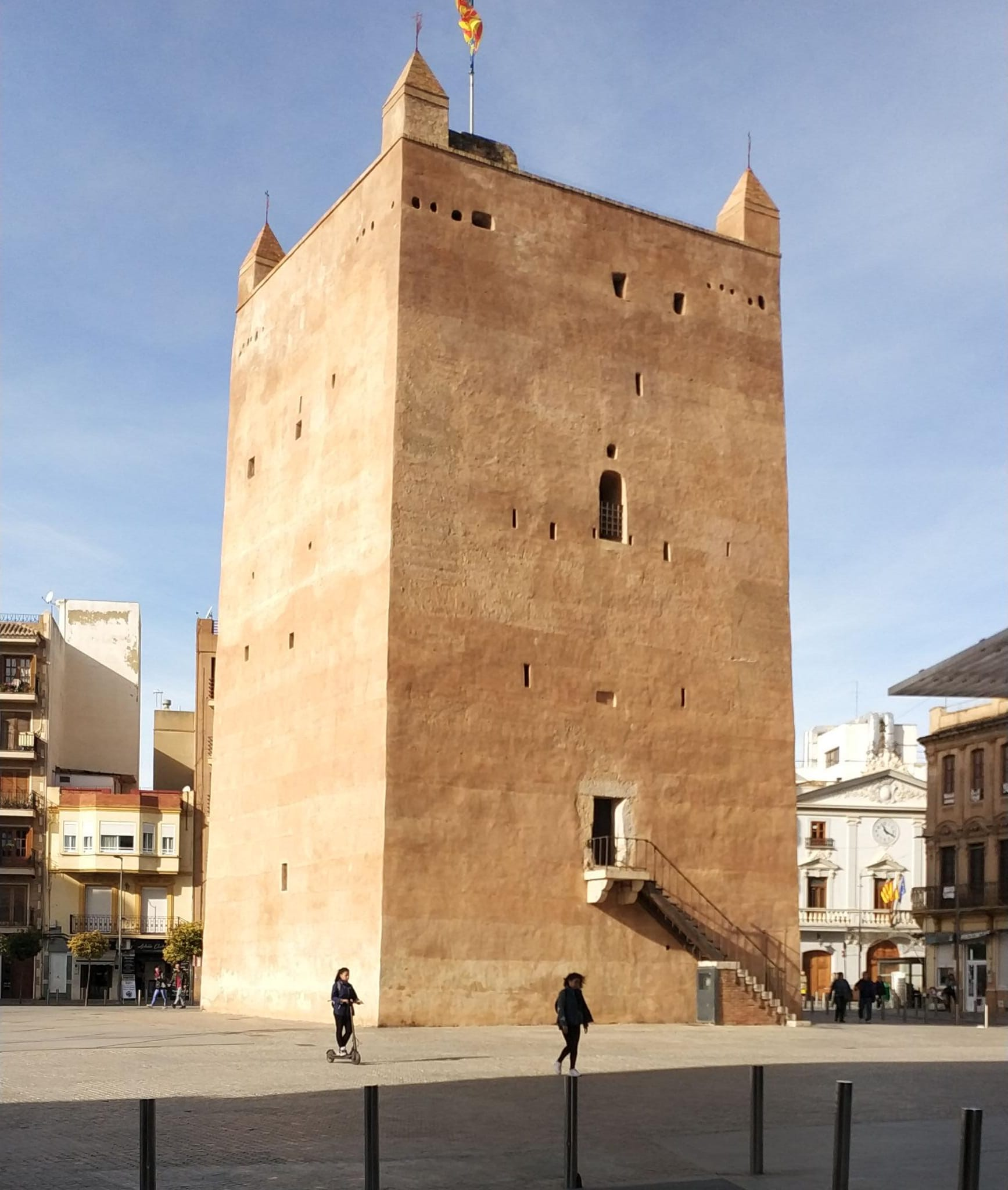
- Moorish tower in the central square

- Coat of arms

- Location of Torrent in the Province of Valencia Location of Torrent in the Valencian Community Location of Torrent in Spain
- Coordinates: 39°26′20″N 0°27′56″W
- Country: Spain
- Autonomous community: Valencian Community
- Province: Valencia
- Comarca: Horta Oest
- Judicial district: Torrent

Government
  - Mayor: Amparo Folgado Tonda (PP)

Area
  - Total: 69.3 km^{2} (26.8 sq mi)
- Elevation: 66 m (217 ft)

Population (2025-01-01)
  - Total: 90,928
  - Density: 1,310/km^{2} (3,400/sq mi)
- Demonyms: • torrentí, -ina (Val.) • torrentino/a (Sp.)
- Official language(s): Valencian; Spanish
- Linguistic area: Valencian
- Time zone: UTC+1 (CET)
  - Summer (DST): UTC+2 (CEST)
- Postal code: 46900
- Website: Official website

Torrent, (Note: Pronunciation of Torrent: Valencian: [toˈrent]) in Valencian (known in Spanish as Torrente), (Note: Pronunciation of Torrente (unofficial) : Spanish: [toˈrente]) is a city and municipality located within the metropolitan area of the city of Valencia, Spain. It is the largest municipality of the Horta Oest comarca, with 83,962 inhabitants (2020). It is situated some 7 km from Valencia city proper, to which it is connected via the metro. The two metro stations in Torrent are called Torrent and Torrent Avinguda on lines 1, 2 and 7.

It is bordered by Aldaia, Alaquàs and Xirivella in the north, Picanya and Catarroja in the east, Alcàsser and Picassent in the south and Montserrat, Godelleta, Turís and Xiva in the West. All of the cities are part of the province of Valencia.

== Geography ==
There are only a few remarkable mountains in the municipal territory: El Vedat (142 m), Morredondo (157 m), Barret (142 m), Cabeçol de l'Aranya (228 m) and the Serra Perenxisa (329 AMSL). About a 20% of the territory is mountainous. Torrent is crossed by a gully (Barranc de Torrent) which flows into the Albufera lagoon and estuary.

== History ==
The village of Torrent was officially founded by people of European ancestry in 1248, after the Reconquista although the tower and its fortification were built several centuries earlier. Archaeological research suggests that there were inhabitants in the zone in the Bronze Age.

It was originally a fief of the Knights Hospitaller.

== Main sights ==
=== The Medieval Tower ===
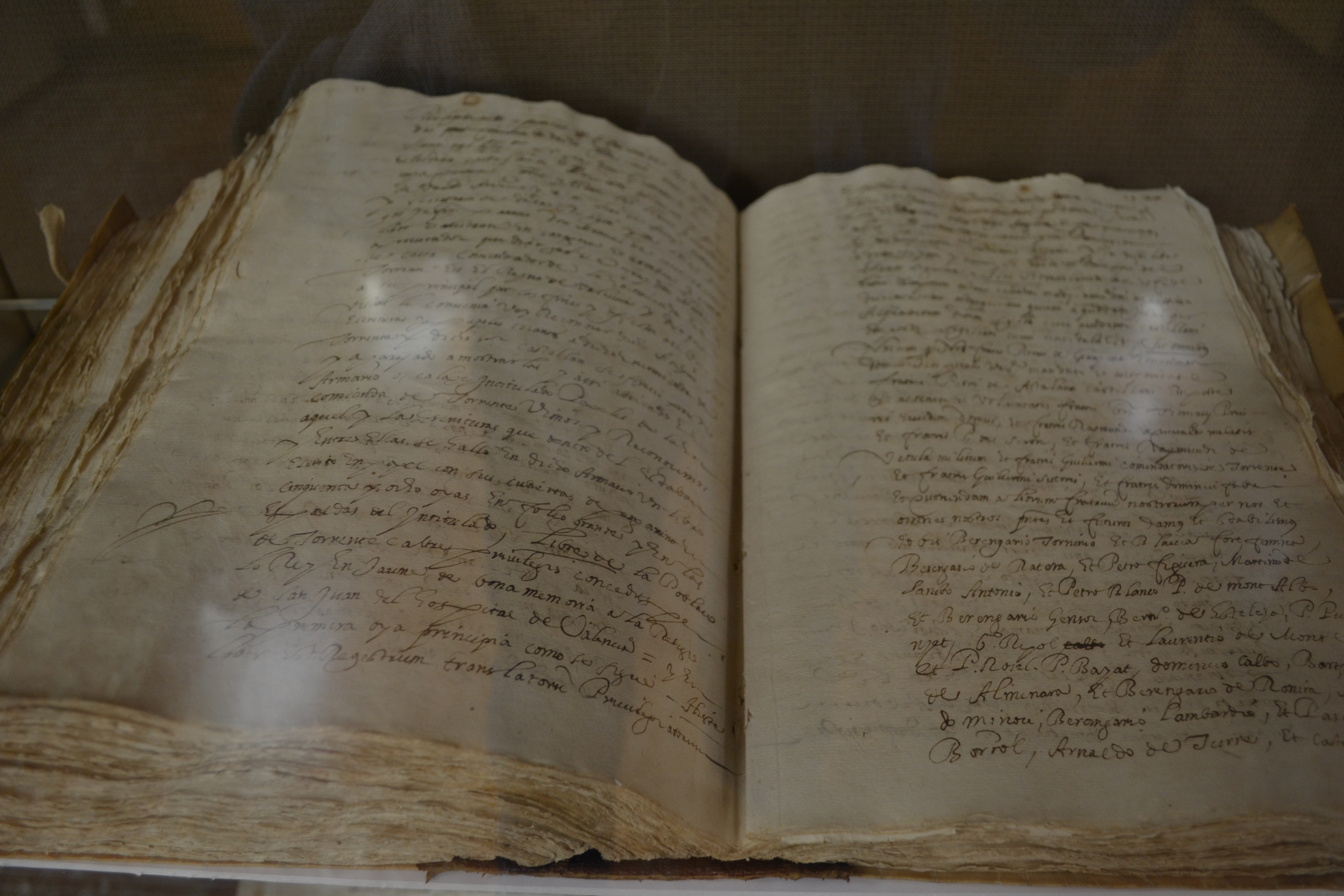
Municipal charter of Torrent and Picanya (1248).

The Medieval Tower was built by the Moors and was part of an ancient castle. It was double-walled and had some underground passages.

The tower, which lies in a square, has a truncated pyramid shape and is 30 metres high, with 5 floors and a terrace where The Cross of the St. John of Jerusalem order and a Valencian "rat penat" can be seen at the four upper corners. Access to the tower is through an exterior staircase connecting to a door at the first floor. Around 1613 porticoes were built around to house a market around the tower. In 1847 it became the property of Torrent.

The tower has often been used as a prison throughout its history, and the porches have hosted the Courts in its upper floors since 1908 (when new ones were built). The porticoes were demolished in 1970. After its restoration, the Tower houses two exhibition halls.

=== Sant Lluís Bertran's Hermitage ===
The shrine dedicated to Saint Lluís Bertran is a traditional and renowned church in Torrent, as festivities of Sant Blai among others are held in the hermitage. In 1634 the City Council agreed to build the chapel dedicated to Saint Lluís Bertran. Following many changes and reconstructions the church was used for military purposes during the Spanish Civil War and was finally restored after that conflict.

Internally, it consists of a nave and two sides. The neoclassical facade is divided into three parts. The door has an archivolt, with St. Lluis' image and a large rosette appearing over the door. The bell tower has a hexagonal base and was finished in 1829. It has four bells and a clock with three spheres, installed there in 1950.

=== Església de l'Assumpció ===
The parish church of Nostra Senyora de l'Assumpció was built in the 13th century, in the same place as the current one, but much smaller. Its rector attended the diocesan synods in the fourteenth century. An image of the "Verge del Pòpul", which disappeared in 1936, was likely the main image in the ancient parish. It has had many fires and thefts with the result that the church that exists nowadays has had many restorations and modifications.

== Local politics ==
Until 2007, the mayor was supplied by the Spanish Socialist Workers' Party (PSOE) who controlled the local council either alone or with the support of smaller left wing parties. The People's Party had majority control of the council from 2007 to 2015. Since 2023, the mayor has been Amparo Folgado Tonda of the People's Party, who have governed in a minority administration with the support of Vox.

=== Summary of council election results ===
	1979	1983	1987	1991	1995	1999	2003	2007	2011	2015	2019	2023
Spanish Socialist Workers' Party (PSOE)	9	15	13	16	11	13	15	11	9	9	11	10
Union of the Democratic Centre (UCD)	8											
United Left (IU)	4	2		1	2					1		
People's Party (PP)		8	8	6	10	10	8	13	14	9	8	9
Valencian Union (UV)		8	2	2	2	2	1					
Democratic and Social Centre (CDS)			2									
Coalició Compromís (Compromís)							1	1	2	4	2	2
Citizens (Cs)										2	2	
Vox (Vox)											2	4
Total number of seats	21	25	25	25	25	25	25	25	25	25	25	25

== Twin towns ==
- Benalup-Casas Viejas, Spain
- Gharb, Malta
- Zebbug, Malta

== Notable people ==
- Paco Alcácer, footballer
- Vicente Guaita, footballer
- Pedro López Muñoz, footballer
- Roger Martí, footballer

== See also ==
- List of municipalities in Valencia
