= Rosa Serrano =

Spanish writer, translator, and editor

Rosa Serrano (born 1945) is a Spanish writer, translator, and editor of books in the Valencian language.

== Biography ==
Rasa Serrano was born in Paiporta in 1945, she graduated in Pedagogy from the University of Barcelona. She launched the Gavina de Picanya school, the first school in Valencian language. She has directed Tàndem Edicions, was a member of consell Consell Valencià de Cultura between 1998 and 2002, is the author of numerous novels, books of poetry and the adaptation for children's readers of the 36 Rondalles Valencianes by Enric Valor, in addition as translator of several novels in French.

== Professional achievements ==
In 1990, together with other colleagues, he launched Tàndem Edicions, a publishing house in Valencian aimed at children's readers, designed at the outset for a sector that at the time had no literary offer in Valencian, namely children aged 3, 4 and 5. In the early years, it stood out for the publication of children's and young people's fiction, as well as materials for teaching Valencian, one of the most outstanding collections being "La Rateta Marieta", which has had up to 48 books.

She has also published work aimed at adult readers, such as the collection dedicated to conversations "Tàndem de la memòria". She was the editor at Tàndem Edicions of novels by the writer Enric Valor such as "L'ambició d'Aleix", "Narracions perennes" and the "Cicle de Cassana" and contributed to popularising Enric Valor and making him a reference point through an intense publicity campaign.

She was a founding member of the Associació d'Editors del País Valencià and its president on several occasions. Member of the council Consell Valencià de Cultura between 1998 and 2002. She is the author of around twenty books on children's and young people's fiction, textbooks and linguistic dissemination. As an author, she has collaborated in the publication of articles and stories in various magazines, such as Faristol, Saó, Clij and Camacuc.

She has been president of the Associació d'Editors del País Valencià and holds the Isabel de Villena Award (1999), the Bromera Foundation Award (2007) and the Vicent Ventura Award (2011). In 2019 the Acadèmia Valenciana de la Llengua recognized his work with the highest academic distinction, highlighting his contribution to the creation of this institution. In 2019 he received the High Distinction of the Generalitat Valenciana for his "cultural work in defence and promotion of the Valencian language.

== Major literary works ==
- La paraula és una aventura (1981)
- Ma casa (1985)
- La domadora de somnis (1990)
- Papers secrets (1991)
- David està malalt (1988)
- Amanida de bruixes (1994)
- El vell mariner (1999)
- Paraules de vidre (2000)
- Noves lectures de les Rondalles d'Enric Valor
- Converses amb un senyor escriptor (1995)
