= Alaquàs =

Alaquàs Alacuás
- Town and municipality
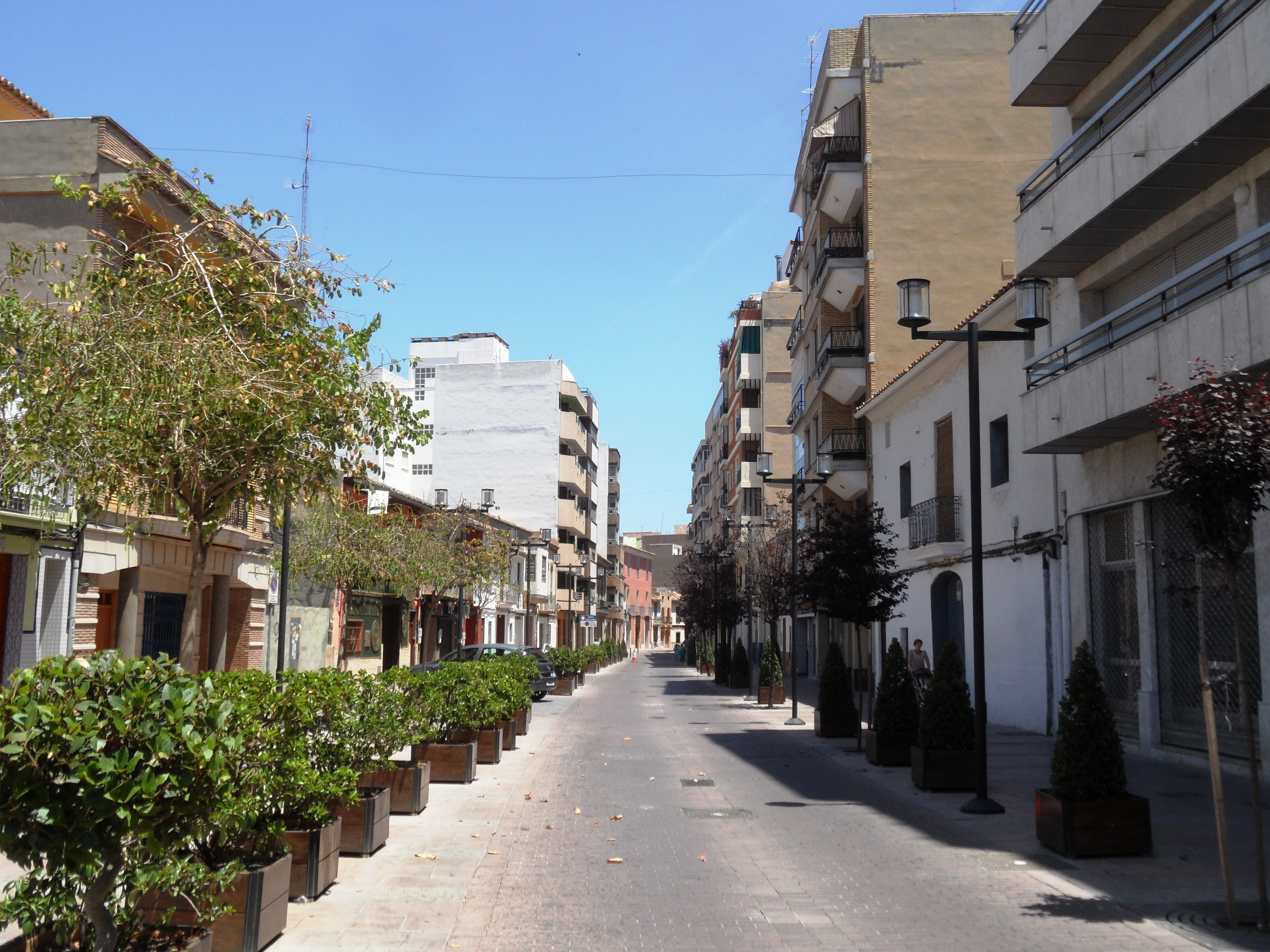

- Coat of arms

- Location in Spain Alaquàs (Valencian Community) Alaquàs (Spain)
- Coordinates: 39°27′30″N 0°27′46″W
- Country: Spain
- Autonomous community: Valencian Community
- Province: València / Valencia
- Comarca: Horta Oest
- Judicial district: Torrent

Government
  - Alcalde (Mayor): Toni Saura (2019) (PSPV-PSOE)

Area
  - Total: 3.9 km^{2} (1.5 sq mi)
- Elevation: 42 m (138 ft)

Population (2025-01-01)
  - Total: 30,166
  - Density: 7,700/km^{2} (20,000/sq mi)
- Demonyms: • alaquaser, -a (Val.) • alacuaser, -a (Sp.)
- Official language(s): Valencian; Spanish
- Linguistic area: Valencian
- Time zone: UTC+1 (CET)
  - Summer (DST): UTC+2 (CEST)
- Postal code: 46970
- Website: Official website

Alaquàs, (Note: Pronunciation of Alaquàs: Valencian: [alaˈkwas]) in Valencian, spelled Alacuás in Spanish, (Note: Pronunciation of Alacuás (unofficial): Spanish: [alaˈkwas]) is a town and municipality in the Horta Oest comarca in the Valencian Community, Spain.

== Etymology ==
The town's name is of Arabic origin, coming from Al-Aquas (الأقواس), meaning "the Arches", believed to be a reference to a bridge of Moorish origin near the town.

== Heritage ==
- Castell-Palau d'Alaquàs
- Església de l'Assumpció
- Església de la Mare de Déu de l'Olivar

== Economy ==
In 2008, Alaquàs was mainly employed in industry (45% of those) and services (53%). Agriculture, with just over 2% of those employed, is a residual sector. In the same year, there were 134 hectares of irrigated land, specifically dedicated to citrus (99 ha) and herbaceous crops (35 ha).

Specialization in bricks and jars gave way to the wood (furniture) industry, metal products manufacture and the food industry. The industrial land occupies about 160 ha, divided between El Bovalar (32 ha; west), Els Mollons and other isolated enclaves. The sectoral distribution of companies was: 59% in the industrial sector, 24% in business services, 9% in consumer services, 3% in agri-food and the remaining 5% in other services.

== Local politics ==
Alaquàs is located in l'Horta, an area known as the red belt (Valencian: cinturó roig) due to its tendency to vote for left wing parties. The Communist Party of Spain won most seats at the 1979 local election and remained strong in the area until the 1990s when they declined, losing their last seat at the 1995 elections. The People's Party received the most votes for the first time at the 2011 local elections.

=== Summary of council seats won ===
	1979	1983	1987	1991	1995	1999	2003	2007	2011	2015	2019	2023
United Left (IU)	8^{*}	6^{*}	8	3	4	1				1		
Spanish Socialist Workers' Party (PSOE)	7	10	8	11	9	11	15	13	10	9	11	10
Union of the Democratic Centre (UCD)	6											
People's Party (PP)		5^{#}	3^{#}	3	7	8	6	8	10	5	5	6
Valencian Union (UV)		5^{#}	1	2	1	1						
Workers' Party - Communist Unity (PTE-UC)			1									
Democratic and Social Centre (CDS)				1								
Coalició Compromís (Compromís)				1 ^{†}					1	3	2	2
Podemos (CET)										2	1	
Citizens (C's)										1	2	
Vox (Vox)												3
Total number of seats	21											

^{*}Results for the Communist Party of Spain. In 1986 they joined with other parties to form the current United Left.

^{#}In 1983, the People's Alliance (AP), Democratic Popular Party (PDP), Liberal Union (UL) and Valencian Union (UV) formed a four party electoral alliance. The electoral alliance ended in 1986 and the AP and UV contested the 1987 local elections separately. In 1989 the AP merged with the PDP and UL to form the current People's Party.

^{†}Results for the Valencian People's Union, who later formed the Valencian Nationalist Bloc (BNV).

== Climate ==
Climate data for Alaquàs (data from 1941–1963, altitude: 43m)
Month	Jan	Feb	Mar	Apr	May	Jun	Jul	Aug	Sep	Oct	Nov	Dec	Year
Mean daily maximum °C (°F)	14.0 (57.2)	15.9 (60.6)	18.5 (65.3)	19.8 (67.6)	22.6 (72.7)	26.1 (79.0)	28.5 (83.3)	28.9 (84.0)	26.6 (79.9)	22.7 (72.9)	18.6 (65.5)	15.3 (59.5)	21.5 (70.7)
Daily mean °C (°F)	9.8 (49.6)	10.8 (51.4)	13.1 (55.6)	15.0 (59.0)	18.0 (64.4)	21.2 (70.2)	24.0 (75.2)	24.7 (76.5)	22.3 (72.1)	18.1 (64.6)	14.0 (57.2)	10.8 (51.4)	16.8 (62.2)
Mean daily minimum °C (°F)	5.6 (42.1)	5.7 (42.3)	7.8 (46.0)	10.1 (50.2)	13.3 (55.9)	16.3 (61.3)	19.6 (67.3)	20.6 (69.1)	18.1 (64.6)	13.6 (56.5)	9.5 (49.1)	6.3 (43.3)	12.2 (54.0)
Average precipitation mm (inches)	23 (0.9)	31 (1.2)	29 (1.1)	30 (1.2)	39 (1.5)	27 (1.1)	6 (0.2)	28 (1.1)	49 (1.9)	83 (3.3)	40 (1.6)	47 (1.9)	432 (17.0)
Source: Sistema de Clasificación Bioclimática Mundial

== International relations ==
=== Twin towns – sister cities ===
Alaquàs is twinned with:

- Cremona, Italy
- Lanjarón, Province of Granada, Spain

== Culture ==
=== Festivals ===
- Village festivals (held from the end of August to the beginning of September), which include, among others, the Correfocs, Moros i Cristians and El Cant de la Carxofa.
- Falles (held on March). Alaquàs has 11 commissions and its own prizes.
- Festa del Porrat (Celebrated in spring in honor of Sant Francesc de Paula)

=== International events ===
- Festival de Rock d'Alaquàs, also known as FRA.

== Bordering towns ==
	North: Aldaya
West: Aldaya		East: Xirivella
	South: Torrent, Picanya

== See also ==
- List of municipalities in Valencia
