= Voltor =

Spanish hardcore-ska band

- Origin: Aldaia, Valencian Community, Spain
- Genres: Rock, hardcore, ska
- Years active: 2002–present
- Labels: Cambra records, Inmortal Records Studies
- Members: Lluís Albert Granell; Abelard (Oli); Guillermo Navarro; Joan F. Mas; Saül; Harpo, Farru, Xuso, Joanra

Voltor (English: Vulture) is a hardcore-ska band from Aldaia, Spain. Their strong social lyrics talk about current issues like freedom of speech, defense of a territory and its roots as well as social justice.

== History ==
Voltor formed in 2002 but it wasn't until two years later that they recorded their first demo. It was called "Identitat" (Identity) and was made up of live songs at Rock Sala (Quart de Poblet) and it included songs like Identitat and Solidaritat. However recorded with some defects it made them known to a wider number of people.

After a line-up reorganisation, some members left the band and five more joined, their first studio album was released in 2005, Aprenent a volar (Learning to fly) consisting of 9 songs, including the highlighted ones of Encén L'oïda (a radio programme which Voltor support and take part), an improved version of Solidaritat, Extrem o Quan no quede res (when it's all gone) with the collaboration of Obrint Pas singer Xavi Sarriá.

== Discography ==
=== Albums ===
- Identitat (Maqueta) - 2004
- Aprenent a volar (Cambra Records, 2005)
- Perill d'extinció (Radikal Records, 2008)
- Disc de la Música en Valencià-La Gira 08 (disc recopilatori editat per Escola Valenciana el 2008)
- Alabastre (2016)
