= Mislata =

- Town and municipality
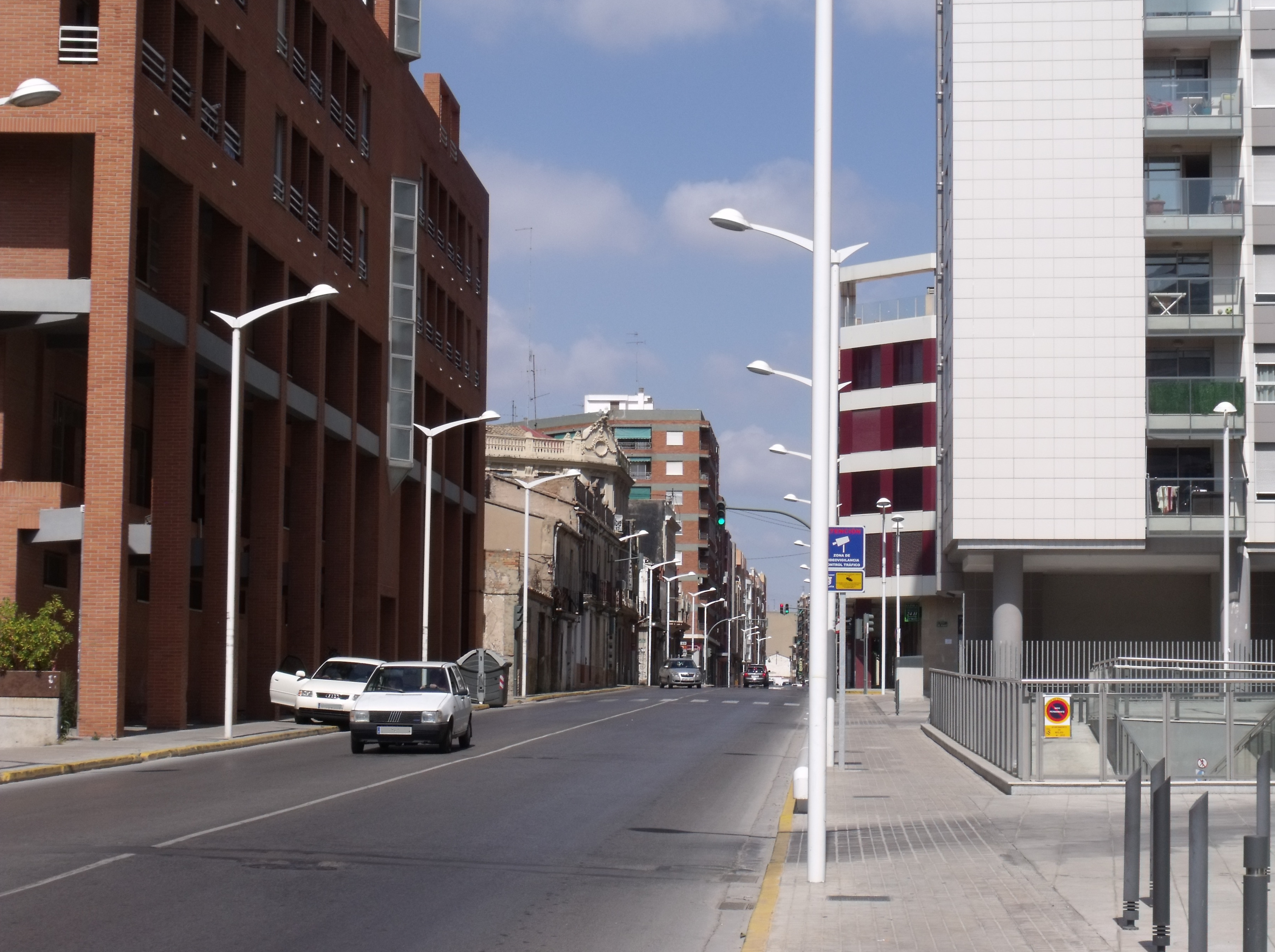

- Coat of arms

- Location of Mislata in the Province of Valencia Location of Mislata in the Valencian Community Location of Mislata in Spain
- Coordinates: 39°28′30″N 0°24′56″W
- Country: Spain
- Autonomous community: Valencian Community
- Province: Valencia / València
- Comarca: Horta Oest
- Judicial district: Mislata

Government
  - Mayor: Carlos Fernández Bielsa (2011-) (PSPV-PSOE)

Area
  - Total: 2.1 km^{2} (0.81 sq mi)
- Elevation: 29 m (95 ft)

Population (2025-01-01)
  - Total: 47,079
  - Density: 22,000/km^{2} (58,000/sq mi)
- Demonyms: Mislatan • mislater, -a (Val.) • mislatero/a (Sp.)
- Official language(s): Valencian; Spanish
- Linguistic area: Valencian
- Time zone: UTC+1 (CET)
  - Summer (DST): UTC+2 (CEST)
- Postal code: 46920
- Website: www.mislata.es

Mislata (Note: Pronunciation of Mislata: Valencian: [mizˈlata] Spanish: [misˈlata]) is a town and municipality in the Valencian Community, Spain. It has borders with the city of Valencia and Quart de Poblet in the west and Xirivella in the south.

== Demographics ==
In recent decades it has gone from being a village in the Horta region of the Valencian Community, to the most densely populated municipality in Spain and one of the ten most densely populated in Europe, with a population of 47,079 spread across 2.1 km^{2}.

Historical population

| Year | Pop. | ±% |
|---|---|---|
| 1842 | 724 | — |
| 1857 | 1,116 | +54.1% |
| 1877 | 1,203 | +7.8% |
| 1887 | 1,293 | +7.5% |
| 1900 | 1,413 | +9.3% |
| 1910 | 1,726 | +22.2% |
| 1920 | 2,528 | +46.5% |
| 1930 | 4,949 | +95.8% |
| 1940 | 6,779 | +37.0% |

| Year | Pop. | ±% |
|---|---|---|
| 1950 | 7,068 | +4.3% |
| 1960 | 11,019 | +55.9% |
| 1970 | 20,102 | +82.4% |
| 1981 | 33,570 | +67.0% |
| 1991 | 38,666 | +15.2% |
| 2001 | 40,548 | +4.9% |
| 2011 | 43,515 | +7.3% |
| 2021 | 44,555 | +2.4% |

Source: INE

This growth has been assisted by better transport communications including the opening of two stations of the Valencian metro on 20 May 1999 in the town which provide a direct connection to the main railway station and the main shopping area in Carrer de Colón. Further extensions westwards to the Valencia airport and the towns of Quart de Poblet and Manises were completed in 2007.

Further construction work which was completed on green belt land in 2005 will further increase Mislata's population density.

The area has been, in a physical sense, almost swallowed up by the encroaching suburbs of Valencia in recent years.

== Transport links ==
Mislata is well connected with central Valencia. In addition to several bus routes, Mislata now has two metro stations, Mislata and Mislata-Almassil. A third station, Nou d'Octubre is nearby. Mislata is the only town outside the city of Valencia to be categorised as "zone A" by the private taxi system.

== Local festivals ==
In addition to the famous Falles festival which runs from 15 to 20 March, numerous other festivals also take place such as those in honour of Saint Michael the Archangel (in September) or Saint Francis of Assisi (in October).

== Monuments and places of interest ==
Mislata's main places of interest are the church of the "Mare de Déu dels Àngels" (Virgin of the Angels) and the "Creu Coberta" (Covered Cross) that separates the town from Valencia.

== Local politics ==
Until 2003, Mislata was controlled by the Spanish Socialist Workers' Party (PSOE), either with an absolute majority or with the support of United Left. The People's Party had a majority administration from 2003 until 2011. Since then the PSOE has had an absolute majority.

=== Summary of council election results ===
| | 1979 | 1983 | 1987 | 1991 | 1995 | 1999 | 2003 | 2007 | 2011 | 2015 | 2019 | 2023 |
|---|---|---|---|---|---|---|---|---|---|---|---|---|
| Spanish Socialist Workers' Party (PSOE) | 9 | 14 | 11 | 11 | 9 | 9 | 9 | 9 | 11 | 14 | 15 | 14 |
| United Left (IU) | 5 | 2 | 1 | 3 | 3 | 2 | 1 | 1 | 1 | | | |
| Union of the Democratic Centre (UCD) | 7 | | | | | | | | | | | |
| People's Party (PP) | | 5 | 4 | 5 | 8 | 9 | 11 | 11 | 9 | 5 | 3 | 4 |
| Valencian Union (UV) | | 5 | 2 | 2 | 1 | 1 | | | | | | |
| Democratic and Social Centre (CDS) | | | 3 | | | | | | | | | |
| Coalició Compromís (Compromís) | | | | | | | | | | 1 | 1 | 1 |
| Citizens (Cs) | | | | | | | | | | 1 | 1 | |
| Vox (Vox) | | | | | | | | | | | 1 | 2 |
| Total number of seats | 21 | 21 | 21 | 21 | 21 | 21 | 21 | 21 | 21 | 21 | 21 | 21 |

== See also ==
- List of municipalities in Valencia
