= Juan Oliver Chirivella =

Spanish politician (born 1935)

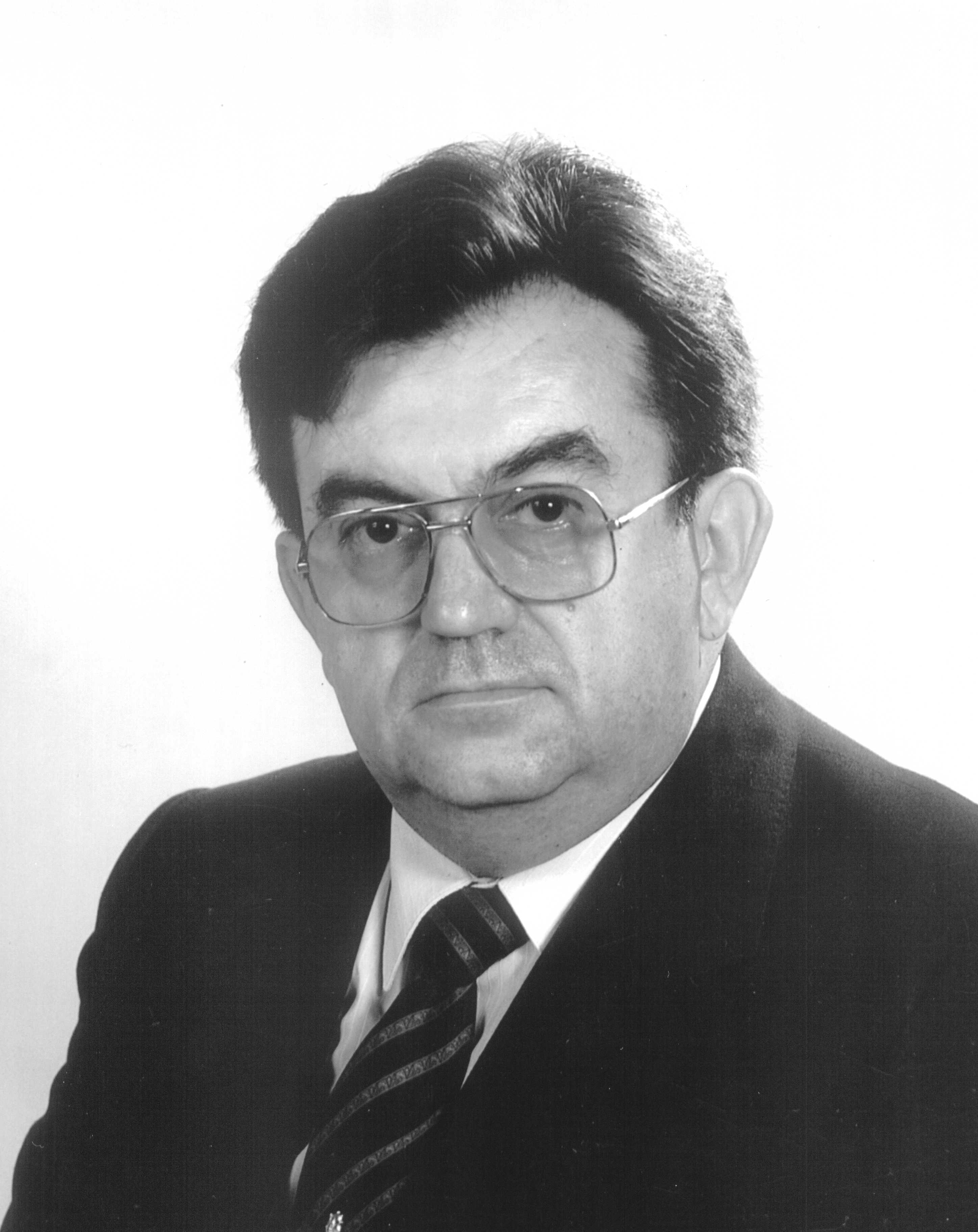
Image of Juan Oliver Chirivella

Juan Oliver Chirivella (Paiporta, Valencia Province, 1935) is a Spanish politician who currently is a member of the People's Party (PP), although he has been a member of several other parties in the past.

== Personal life ==
Married with one son, Oliver qualified as a technical engineer and worked for the company Siemens reaching a high position in the local branch of the company.

== Political career ==
The first political grouping he joined was the Democratic Popular Party (PDP) in 1979. The PDP was part of the larger coalition Union of the Democratic Centre (UCD) which formed the Spanish government from 1977 to 1982.

He served as a councillor on Valencia city council before the first democratic elections in the post Franco era. He also served as a provincial deputy for Valencia Province to the Corts Valencianes, the Valencian regional parliament from 1979 to 1991.

When the UCD disbanded in 1983, he joined the Popular Alliance, remaining a member until 1987 when he joined the regional party Valencian Union (UV). He stood as a UV candidate in the 1987 European election but was not elected.

He then turned his attention to national politics and was placed second on the UV list for the 1989 General Election and was elected to the national parliament as a deputy for Valencia province. However two years later, he defected to the PP but did not stand at the 1993 General Election.

Since 1995 he has been Health Minister in the Valencian regional administration.
