= Quart de Poblet =

Quart de Poblet Cuart de Poblet
- Town and municipality
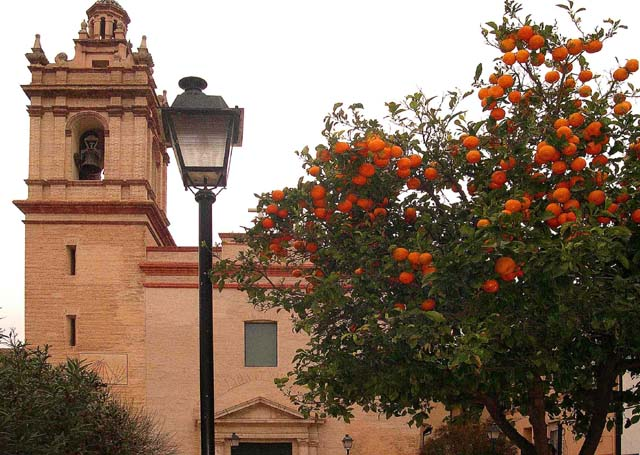

- Coat of arms

- Location of Quart de Poblet Quart de Poblet (Valencian Community) Quart de Poblet (Spain)
- Coordinates: 39°29′0″N 0°26′34″W
- Country: Spain
- Autonomous community: Valencian Community
- Province: Valencia / València
- Comarca: Horta Sud
- Judicial district: Quart de Poblet

Government
  - Alcalde (Mayor): Cristina Mora Luján (2023) (PSPV–PSOE)

Area
  - Total: 19.6 km^{2} (7.6 sq mi)
- Elevation: 40 m (130 ft)

Population (2025-01-01)
  - Total: 26,967
  - Density: 1,380/km^{2} (3,560/sq mi)
- Demonyms: • quartà, -ana (Val.) • cuartano/a (Sp.)
- Official language(s): Valencian; Spanish
- Linguistic area: Valencian
- Time zone: UTC+1 (CET)
  - Summer (DST): UTC+2 (CEST)
- Postal code: 46930
- Website: www.quartdepoblet.org

Quart de Poblet, (Note: Pronunciation of Quart de Poblet: Valencian: [ˈkwaɾd de poˈblet]) in Valencian (Spanish and unofficially: Cuart de Poblet), (Note: Pronunciation of Cuart de Poblet (unofficial): [ˈkwaɾ(ð) ðe poˈβlet]) or simply Quart (Note: Pronunciation of Quart: Valencian: [ˈkwaɾt]) (Spanish: Cuart), (Note: Pronunciation of Cuart: [ˈkwaɾ(t)]) is a municipality in the comarca of Horta Sud in the Valencian Community, Spain. It has 25,499 inhabitants (NSI 2009).

== Geography ==
Located between the Valencian Horta Sud, the area surface is completely flat. The Túria river crosses the municipality by north and on the west runs the Rambla del Poio. The climate is Mediterranean, with rainfall in autumn and spring, the prevailing winds are west and east.

=== Infrastructure and access road ===
The main lines of traffic at west of the metropolitan area of Valencia ply the municipality of Quart of Poblet. Thus, both the town and the many industrial sites are connected by highway with other surrounding municipalities and large capacity roads.

- The motorway A-3/E-901 Madrid–Valencia or eastern highway, old N-III runs longitudinally south of Quart and provides three hits, one of which refers to the airport.
- The V-30 bypass freeway, parallel to the new channel of the river Túria, draw a diagonal line between the North-West and Southeast of the town, while the V-11 road serves to Quart and connects to the Valencia airport terminal . Other local roads, as the CV-408 and CV-31, serve as a link, but fragmented by industrial plants, with neighboring towns.

The Renfe train station Operadora, in the old C-4 line Valencia North – Riba-Roja de Túria was adapted to line 5 of Ferrocarrils de la Generalitat Valenciana inaugurated on April 18, 2007, a new section connecting Quart de Poblet with Valencia metro system.

In addition, several Metrobus lines connect Quart de Poblet with Valencia and other locations (see links).

=== Hamlets and neighborhood ===
Quart de Poblet includes the following neighborhoods:

- Barri Sant Jeroni.
- Barri del Crist.
- Barri Sant Josep.

=== Bordering towns ===
The municipality of Quart de Poblet limits with the localities of Aldaia, Xirivella, Chiva, Manises, Mislata, Paterna, Riba-roja de Túria, and Valencia. All from the Province of Valencia.

== History ==
Quart de Poblet was probably founded by the Romans. The historian Euriclidión describes in his work how neighbors of Quartum helped Hannibal's army at be paralyzed by the River. Its name derives from the Latin word quartum miliarium, which refers to the distance that separates it from Valencia. As vestiges of that era survive remains of the Roman bridge and the aqueduct Els Arquetes.

However, it was in the Middle Ages when its people became protagonists of important events in the history of Valencia: Rodrigo Diaz de Vivar, El Cid, led in Quart de Poblet a significant battle against the Almoravids forces named like the town and is reflected in the Cantar de Mio Cid, and in sources highlights the reference to the Quart de Poblet Castle, now gone.

After the Reconquista, King James I of Aragon gave the Castle, the town of Quart and the farmstead of Aldaia to the Priory of the Hospital of Aldaia of Sant Vicent de la Roqueta (in the Book of distribution distribution folio 78-v °, seat # 1472 – consists that on January 7, 1244, Jaime I said, I quote: "A Sant Vicent, el Castell i la Vila de Quart, i l'alcria de Ladea -Aldaia-"). At that time, the population had only 130 houses with old Christians.

It was in 1287 when Quart, by decision of King Alfonso II of Aragon was under the jurisdiction of the Monastery of Santa Maria de Poblet, belonging to the Cistercian order dependent and the San Vicente de la Roqueta. In fact, a monk of St. Vincent continued to be the foreman of the place, but sometimes delegated the functions to the mayor. In 1332, King Alfonso IV gave permission to the abbot of Poblet, Ponce de Copons, to expel the Moorish and in 1334 granted the charter of settlement to 52 families of Catalonia and Aragon, who made Quart de Poblet their new home. This charter consecrate the birth of the modern city. The dependence of Poblet was maintained until the confiscation decreed by Juan Alvarez Mendizabal in 1835. It was a legacy the second part of the name of the municipality.

The Parish Church of the Immaculate Conception was built in the 14th century, but was rebuilt in the 18th century in Baroque style, and is between 1310 and 1320 the construction of the hermitage of Sant Onofre, following the advent of the holy hermit to a miller .

On June 14, 1630, meeting the pastor of Quart, faithful and juries of the Council agreed to proclaim to the Verge de la Llum patron of the Villa. It was pope Urban VIII.

The Procession of Sant Onofre, one of the most deeply rooted traditions in Quart de Poblet, was born on June 8, 1723, after a period of drought. Seven decades later, Aldaia won the lawsuit that forced the partition of the area.

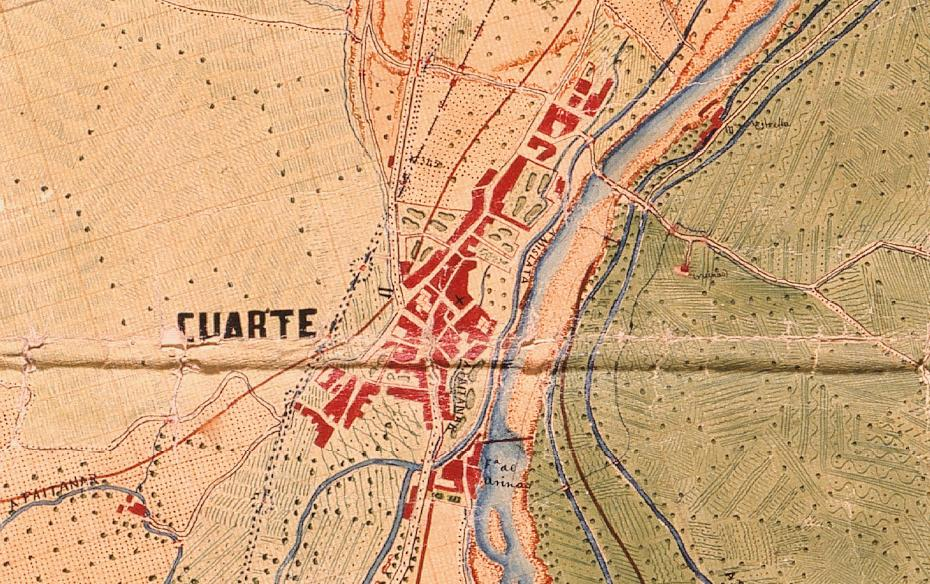
Quart de Poblet

Throughout the 19th century, the inhabitants of Quart de Poblet participated in the War of Independence ( Sant Onofre Combat ), which did not hesitate to face Napoleon's troops in the so-called Battle of Sant Onofre (June 27, 1808). The troops of the Division Valencia were captained by Brigadier Saint-Marc. Pope Leo XIII stated in this holy anchorite, who is credited with the miracle of the end of a cholera epidemic in 1885, principal patron of the villa.

The musical group La Amistad and the Cooperative San Jose were founded, and on May 23, 1889, a whistle announced to the public, the step, for the first time, the commuter train line Valencia – Riba-roja de Túria

Already in the 20th century, the town became the starting point of the so-called Plan Sur, which involved the diversion of the river Turia after the tragic flood of 1957 with the objective of not traversing Valencia. For his area runs A-3 highway that connects Valencia and Madrid, which has led the development of one of the most important industrial areas of the province and a major population change. If in the early 1960s, Quart de Poblet had little more than five thousand inhabitants, ten years after the arrival of people, mainly from Andalusia, Murcia, Aragon and Castilla-La Mancha, whose work and contributions have enriched culturally and economically the town, fired that figure and stood at nearly 26,000 current residents.

On April 19, 1979, the first democratic City Council since the Spanish Civil War of 1936 was set up in Quart de Poblet.

In recent years Quart de Poblet has seen the completion of the burial work of line 5 of MetroValencia throughout the municipality, which has led the demise of the Valencia commuter C4 line pathways from Vara de Quart to Quart of Poblet, leaving no rail link with the municipality of Xirivella but connecting the airport of Valencia and the towns of Manises. From Quart de Poblet the centre of Valencia can be reached in less than 25 minutes.

== Demography ==
Quart de Poblet has a population of 25,441 inhabitants (INE 2008).

5.5% of the population of Quart de Poblet is a foreign national (INE 2007).

Demographic evolution of Quart de Poblet
| 1857 | 1887 | 1900 | 1910 | 1920 | 1930 | 1940 | 1950 | 1960 | 1970 | 1981 | 1991 | 1996 | 2001 | 2006 | 2007 | 2008 |
|---|---|---|---|---|---|---|---|---|---|---|---|---|---|---|---|---|
| 1.674 | 1.921 | 1.814 | 2.263 | 2.644 | 3.152 | 3.993 | 5.408 | 10.571 | 20.529 | 27.409 | 27.404 | 27.112 | 25.739 | 25.430 | 25.340 | 25.441 |

== Economy ==
The main crops are irrigated: oranges, pear trees, vegetables, onions, potatoes, etc. In dryland are grown cereal, vine, carobs, olives.

Traditional industries are textiles, refractories, ceramics, etc..

== Monuments ==
- Parish Church. Dedicated to the Immaculate Conception. It was rebuilt in the 18th century and restored in 1916.The chapel of the Virgin is the work of Bartolomé Ribelles Dalmau. In 1958 he created the parish of the Holy Christ.
- Hermitage of Sant Onofre. Within the urban expansion has remained this chapel where are the images of patron saints: Sant Onogre and the Virgin Light.
- Arab tank. The monumental section, the highlight of Quart de Poblet is its Arabic tank, unparalleled in the region, which was in a secluded place no longer exists due to the expansion of the Church. Historic-artistic archaeological monument, in 1981.

== Culture ==
- The Symphonic Band L'Amistat was founded in 1895.
- Choir Veus Juntes 1975
- Dance of Quart de Poblet 1978
- Barrio del Crist Musical Association 1984
- Musical artistic society La Unió 1991
- Choir Farinelli 1995
- Cultural Association of drums and widgets Va de Bo 1997

== Social ==
=== Accessibility in the City ===
In recent years, it has done an estimable effort by municipal authorities to remove architectural barriers in public via and official centers. This multi-year plan, already has received recognition from the Ministry of Labour to give the City the Reina Sofia Award 2005 Universal Accessibility. It has also taken a big step to start the subway line, fully accessible, built by the Generalitat Valenciana.

== Local Festivals ==
January 5. Cavalcade of Magi Kings.

January 17. Feast of Sant Antoni de Portmany Blessing of animals and distribution of blessed bread rolls.

March 19. Falles.

March. Midyear Proceedings of Moors and Christians.

March / April. Holy Week.

May 1. Festivals in the neighborhood of St. Joseph.

June 1. Virgin Birth, patroness of the villa.

June 9. Procession of Sant Onofre.

June 10. Feast of Sant Onofre. Market in Sant Onofre Avenue, concert of the Musical Association L'Amistat and Procession.

June. Corpus Christi. Civic religious procession moves to the Sunday following the holiday.

End of June. Festivals in the neighborhood of St. Jerònim.

September. Major Festivals, Patron Saint festivities, Populars and Moors and Christians, which start on Friday preceding the first Sunday of the month.

October 9. Valencia Day.

November. Events in honor of St. Cecília, patron saint of music.

December. Christmas fair in Sports Center.

=== Moors and Christians celebrations. ===
Its origin dates back to 1985. They are made in commemoration of the battle the Cid fought against the troops Almoravids under the leadership of Muhammad, nephew of the emir of northern Africa Tashfin ibn Yusuf, on the Plain of Quart that led to the release of Valencia from Muslim threats of that time for a brief period, in addition to being the first defeat of the Almoravid army in the peninsula from Christian hands.

Today, the party is governed by the Association of Moors and Christians of Quart de Poblet, and is composed of eight groups.

Moorish side

- Faitanar
- Ali Ben Bufat
- Hussun Kaaba
- Almahà Ben Jové
- Al-Bayrah

Christians side

- Pirates
- Guerrers del Cid
- Creuats

The festival takes place the following days:

- Thursday (night) Proclamation of Events
- Friday (night) Estafeta, Moorish Embassy, and Battle
- Saturday (am) Parade-visit to the captaincy.
- Saturday (night) Christian and Moorish Entry
- Sunday (am) Children's Parade
- Sunday (afternoon) Alliance, Estafeta, Christian Embassy, and the Battle of the Pla de Quart.

== See also ==
- List of municipalities in Valencia
