= Bacchus of Aldaia =

Ancient Roman statuette of Dionysus

- Spanish: Baco de Aldaya
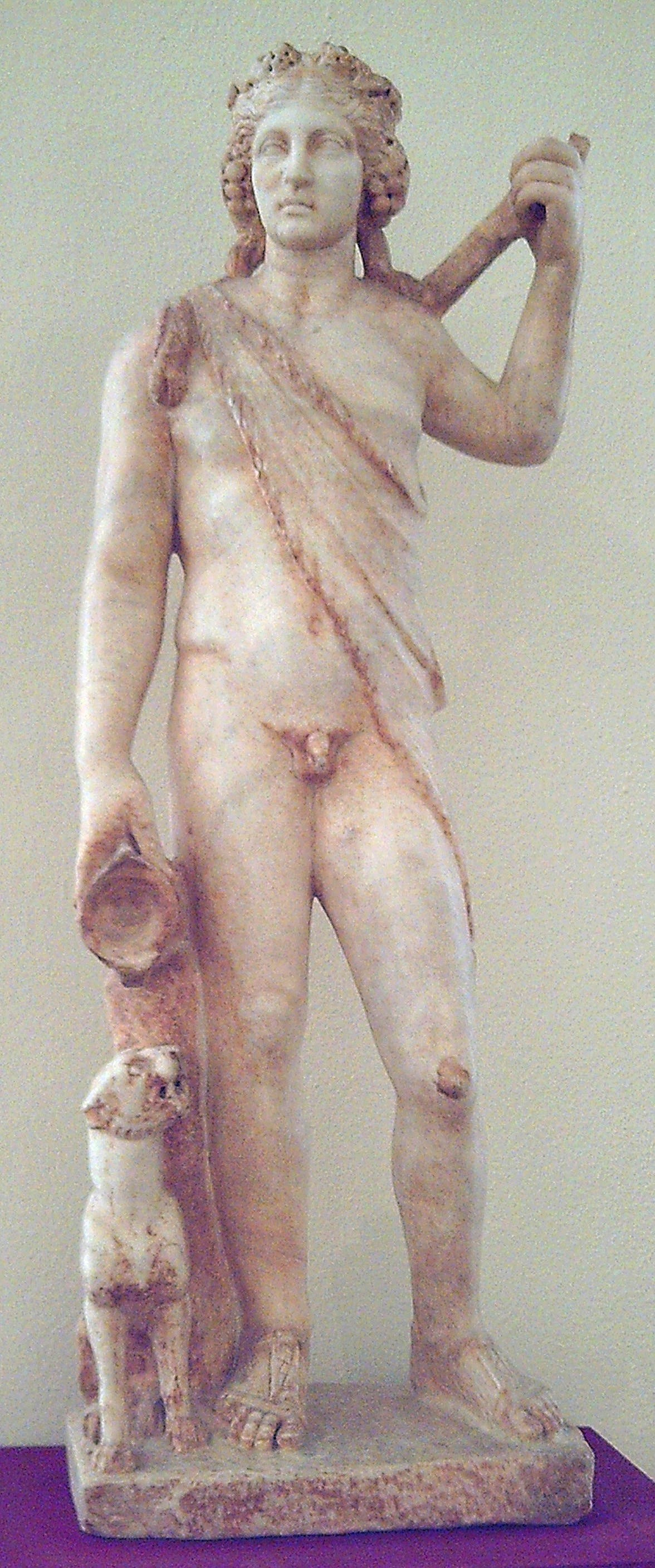
- The statue today in the NAMM
- Year: 2nd century AD
- Medium: Marble
- Movement: Roman
- Subject: the god Dionysus
- Dimensions: 1.09 m (43 in)
- Condition: Thyrsus missing, otherwise intact
- Location: National Archaeological Museum, Madrid
- Owner: Spain
- Website: www.man.es/man/en/home.html

The Bacchus of Aldaia (Spanish: Baco de Aldaya) is an ancient Roman marble statuette of the Roman god Bacchus (Dionysus) that was found in La Ereta dels Moros in Aldaia, Valencia, in Spain, in two fragments between the years 1884 and 1924. The god is depicted naked except for a deer skin draped over him and wearing sandals and a floral crown. The sculpture is now exhibited in the National Archaeological Museum of Spain in the capital Madrid.

== Discovery ==
The lower part of the sculpture was found in 1884 in the La Ereta dels Moros farm, in Aldaia, by a man named Pascual Simón who was plowing his fields. The family decided to keep the findings, believing that they were part of an image of Saint Roch. Around 1924, by which time the man who made the discovery was already deceased, his son stumbled upon the rest of the sculpture while tilling the same field. It was then, upon seeing the complete naked sculpture, when they realized that it could not be the image of a saint and sold it to a Valencian scholar. By 1931 it was already part of the catalogue of the National Archaeological Museum of Spain, where it was reconstructed and restored.

A replica of the statuette is also displayed in the Prehistory Museum of Valencia.

== Description and dating ==
The Bacchus of Aldaia is made of white marble, and at a height of 109 cm he is smaller than lifesize. The god is represented as a young man, wearing a crown of flowers and a ribbon (taenia) on his head. He is naked, except for a deerskin draped across his torso, and wears sandals. In his right hand he carries a wine jug, under which a panther appears vigilant. In his left hand he would be carrying his emblematic pinecone staff (thyrsus), which is not preserved.

The movement of the body is minimal; the hips are still, despite the fact that Bacchus rests his weight on his right foot (contrapposto). The arms are also not accompanied by a movement of the shoulders, so the figure suffers from a certain stiffness. Due to its characteristics, it has been ruled out that the work is based on a Greek model. For this reason in addition, it can probably be dated to the second century, although some scholars date it to the first century.

Bacchus being a god means that the statue's features can be those of an idealization. However, since the features and expression are undoubtedly those of a young man, certain authors speculate that it is a portrait of a person with the attributes of divinity, a relatively common occurrence within the Greco-Roman statuary tradition.

== Origin and use ==
The marble has not been yet analyzed, so it cannot be known without a doubt whether it was created in Tarraconese workshops or it was imported. However, even if the material was imported, it would be difficult to verify if it was sculpted after importation or if the piece was already sculpted. Due to its small size, it is more likely than not that it was made for private use, since public worship preferred larger sculptures. Furthermore, due to it having been found on the site of a Roman rural villa, its location within it would have been in the decorative sculptural space of the garden or peristyle of a house, places where the sculptures of Dionysus/Bacchus, who is related to nature, were always located.

== See also ==
- Las Incantadas
- Hope Dionysus
- Ludovisi Dionysus
