= Enric Valor i Vives =

Valencian writer

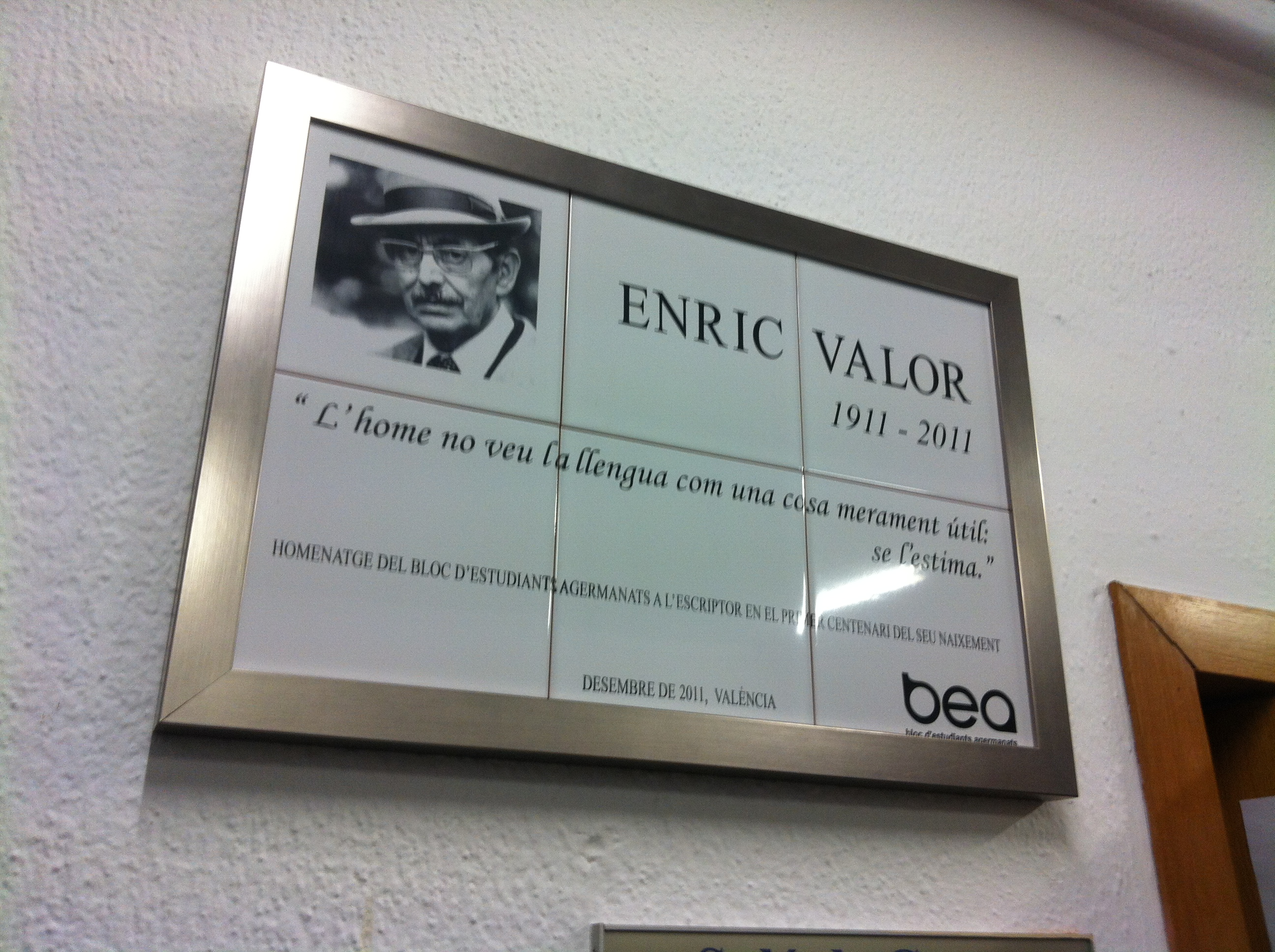
A plaque to Valor i Vives at the University of Valencia.

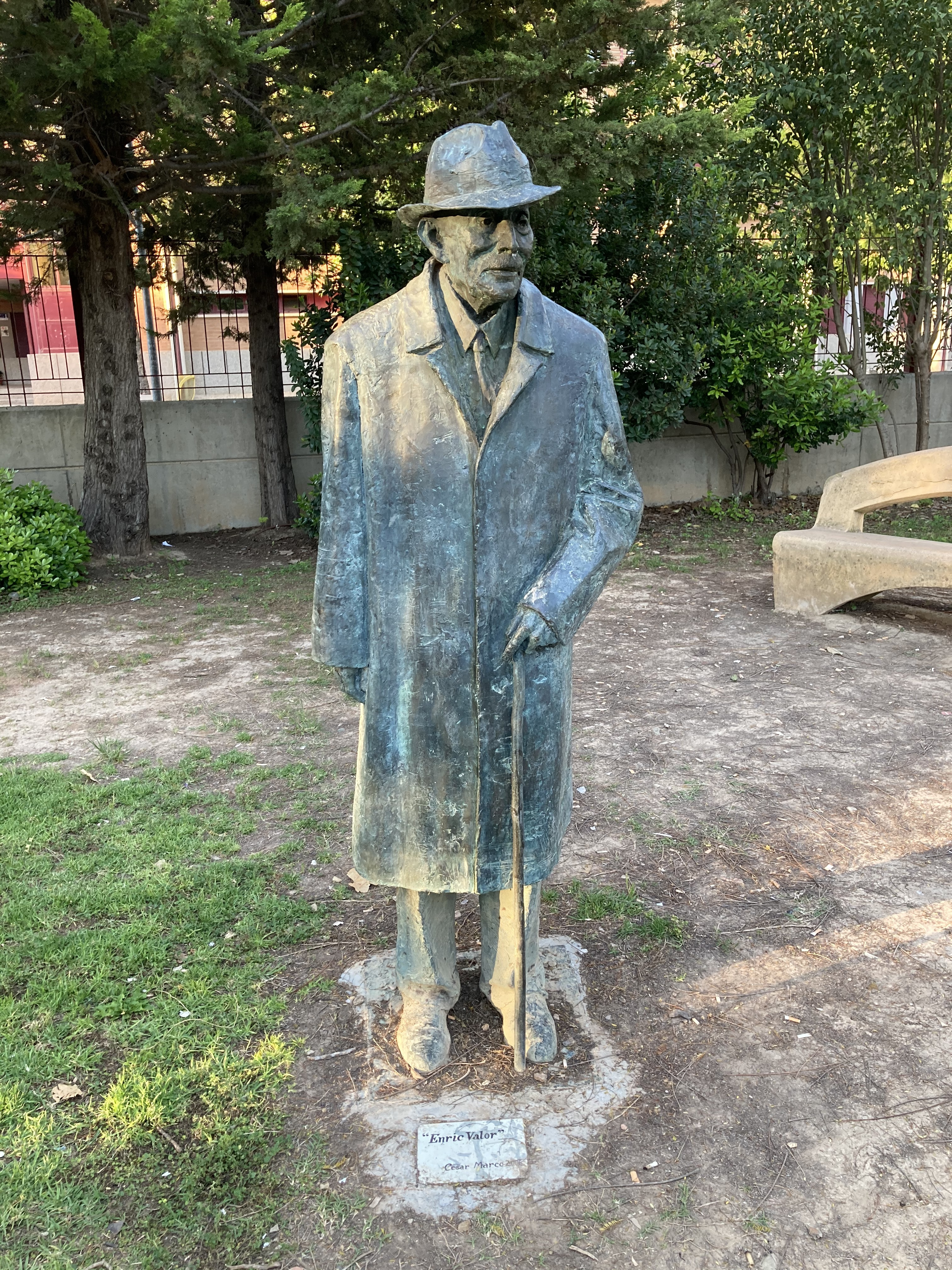
Statue of Enric Valor in Picanya, sculptured by the artist César Marco in 2006.

Enric Valor i Vives (Valencian pronunciation: [enˈriɡ vaˈloɾ]; 1911 in Castalla, Alicante, Spain – 2000 in Valencia, Spain) was a Spanish narrator and grammarian who made one of the most important contributions to the re-collection and recovery of Valencian lexicography and its standardization in the Valencian Community, Spain.

== Biography ==
Enric Valor was born in 1911, the son of an affluent family from Castalla, in the Valencian comarca of l'Alcoià. In 1930, at the age of nineteen, he became a journalist in Alicante writing in the satirical newspaper El Tio Cuc, in Valencian. During the Second Spanish Republic he started to become politically active. His main demand was for autonomous status for the Valencian Country. He was also at this time working in the city of Valencia in the nationalist newspapers La República de les Lletres, El Camí and El País Valencià. When the Spanish Civil War broke out he supported the Spanish Republic.

After the war, he cut back on his political activities to concentrate on literature. At the beginning of the 1950s he started to compile "rondalles", a type of folk narrative, which were published as Rondalles valencianes (1950–1958). During the 1960s he returned to underground political activities involving Valencian nationalism and, as a result, he became a political prisoner of Francisco Franco's Spanish State from 1966 to 1968. Once out of prison he founded almost the first magazine in Valencian in the postwar period; Gorg ("Whirl", in Valencian). When the Francoist State ended, Enric Valor was able to spread freely his opinions and literary works. He became honoured with many important literary and linguistic awards from all over the Països Catalans. During the 1990s there was a move among some Valencian cultural groups to propose Valor as a candidate for the Nobel Prize in Literature, but it didn't come to fruit.

Valor then died in 2000.

== Linguistic works ==
His first linguistic work was in the weekly magazine El Tio Cuc based in Alicante. He was contributing to the development of the Catalan-Valencian-Balearic Dictionary (such a Catalan inter-dialectal dictionary) under the directorship of Francesc de Borja i Moll, which included a Southern Valencian lexicon. Like Carles Salvador and Sanchis Guarner, he was one of the principal promoters of the standardisation of Valencian by means of works such as Curs de la llengua valenciana (Gorg, 1961), Millorem el llenguatge (1971), and Curso medio de gramática catalana referida especialmente al País Valenciano (1973).

In 1983 he released La flexió verbal where he summarized the widely dialectised Valencian verbs. This work became the principal reference for the normative use of verbs, and is used as essential teaching material for Valencian pupils.

== Literary works ==
His most known work is Rondalles valencianes (1950–1958), where 36 valencian popular tales are collected as a literary narration. Other works with a similar style are Narracions de la Foia de Castalla (1953), and Meravelles i picardies (1964–1970).

Valor was also a writer. His first novel was L'ambició d'Aleix which was started between the 1940s and 1950s, but it was being re-written until its release in 1960. Perhaps his most important novel work is Cicle de Cassana which is made up of three novels: Sense la terra promesa (1960), Temps de batuda (1983), and Enllà de l'horitzó (1991). The Cicle de Cassana trilogy aims for the regaining of collective memory between 1916 and 1939. In 1982 he published La idea de l'emigrant.

== Awards and honors ==
- 1983, Sanchis Guarner's Award (Premi Sanchis Guarner), from the Valencia Province Council.
- 1985, Valencian Arts Award (Premi de les Lletres Valencianes) from Valencia City Council.
- 1986, Member of the Philological Department in the Institut d'Estudis Catalans.
- 1987, Premi d'Honor de les Lletres Catalanes (Catalan Arts Honored Award) from the Òmnium Cultural de Barcelona.
- 1987, Member of the Advisory Board in the Interuniversitary Institute of Valencian Philology (Institut Interuniversitari de Filologia Valenciana).
- 1993, Honoris Causa Doctor by the Universitat de València.
- 1993, Saint George's Cross (Creu de Sant Jordi) from the Generalitat de Catalunya.
- 1996, Miquelet d'Honor from the Societat Coral El Micalet, de Valencia.
- 1997, Premi Cavanilles from the Valencian Institute of Nature and Hiking (Institut Valencià d'Excursionisme i Natura).
- 1998, Honoris Causa Doctor by the Universitat de les Illes Balears.
- 1999, Honoris Causa Doctor by the Universitat Jaume I from Castelló.
- 1999, Honoris Causa Doctor by the Universitat d'Alacant.
- 1999, Honoris Causa Doctor by the Universitat Politècnica de València.
