= Catarroja =

- Town and municipality
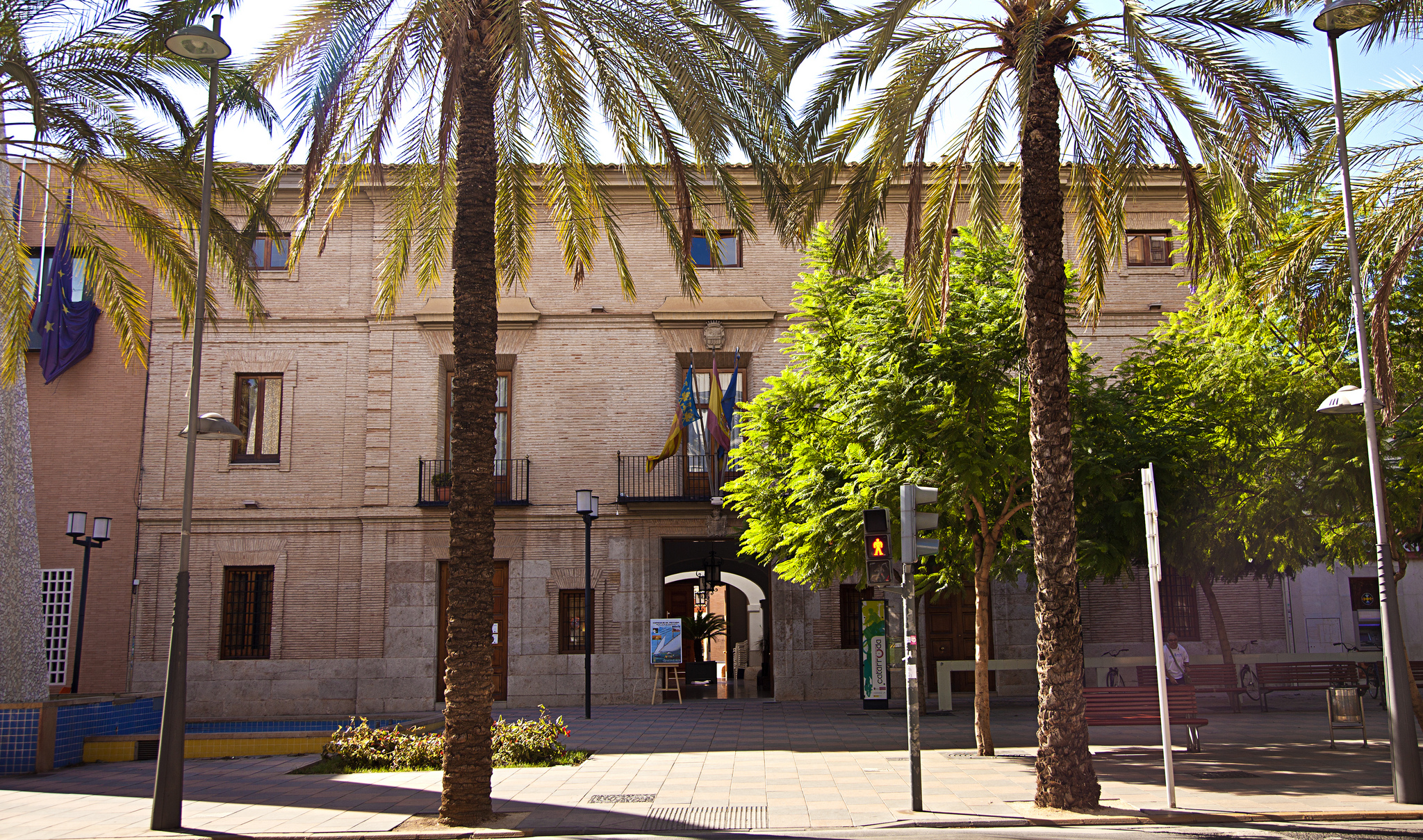

- Coat of arms

- Location in Spain Catarroja (Valencian Community) Catarroja (Spain)
- Coordinates: 39°24′10″N 0°24′16″W
- Country: Spain
- Autonomous community: Valencian Community
- Province: Valencia
- Comarca: Horta Sud
- Judicial district: Catarroja

Government
  - Alcaldessa (Mayoress): Lorena Silvent Ruiz (PSPV-PSOE)

Area
  - Total: 13 km^{2} (5.0 sq mi)
- Elevation: 16 m (52 ft)

Population (2025-01-01)
  - Total: 30,604
  - Density: 2,400/km^{2} (6,100/sq mi)
- Demonyms: Catarrojan • catarrogí, -ina (Val.) • catarrojín, -ina (Sp.)
- Official language(s): Valencian; Spanish
- Linguistic area: Valencian
- Time zone: UTC+1 (CET)
  - Summer (DST): UTC+2 (CEST)
- Postal code: 46470
- Website: Official website

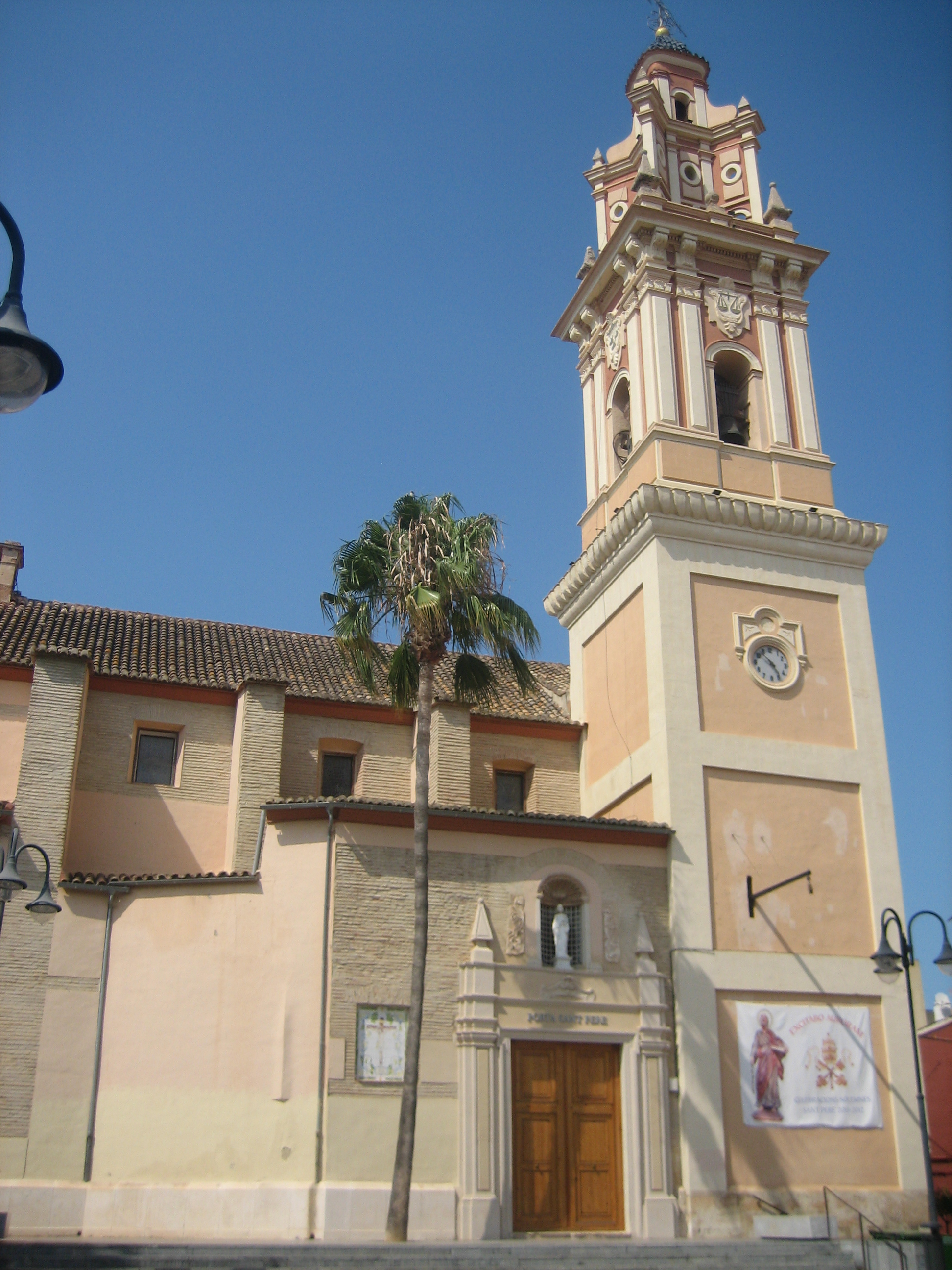
Church of San Miguel, Catarroja.

Catarroja (Note: Pronunciation of Catarroja: Valencian: [kataˈrɔdʒa], also [kataˈrɔdʒɔ] Spanish: [kataˈroxa]) is a town and municipality in the comarca of Horta Sud in the Valencian Community, Spain.

In October 2024 it was devastated by the overflow of the Poyo river.

== Toponym ==
The town name is originally a hybrid between the Arabic term إقطاع (iqṭā), which means "land", and the Valencian term roja, which means "red".

== Local politics ==
The Spanish Socialist Workers' Party held the mayoralty from 1979 until 1995 when a People's Party-led administration replaced them. This served until 2015 when Coalició Compromís gained the mayoral position as part of a minority administration.

=== Summary of council seats won ===
| | 1979 | 1983 | 1987 | 1991 | 1995 | 1999 | 2003 | 2007 | 2011 | 2015 | 2019 | 2023 |
|---|---|---|---|---|---|---|---|---|---|---|---|---|
| Union of the Democratic Centre (UCD) | 7 | | | | | | | | | | | |
| Spanish Socialist Workers' Party (PSOE) | 7 | 12 | 11 | 11 | 8 | 4 | 7 | 8 | 6 | 4 | 6 | 7 |
| United Left (IU) | 2^{*} | 1^{*} | 1 | 1 | 2 | | 1 | 1 | 2 | 5 | 1 | |
| People's Party (PP) | | 8^{#} | 2^{#} | 2 | 7 | 9 | 10 | 10 | 11 | 5 | 4 | 5 |
| Valencian Union (UV) | 1 | 8^{#} | 7 | 7 | 4 | 4 | 2 | 1 | | | | |
| Progressive Independent Group | | | | | | 3 | | | | | | |
| Coalició Compromís (Compromís) | | | | | | 1^{†} | 1^{†} | 1^{†} | 2 | 5 | 7 | 5 |
| Citizens (C's) | | | | | | | | | | 2 | 3 | |
| Vox (Vox) | | | | | | | | | | | | 4 |
| Total number of seats | 17 | 21 | 21 | 21 | 21 | 21 | 21 | 21 | 21 | 21 | 21 | 21 |

^{*}Results for the Communist Party of Spain. In 1986 they joined with other parties to form the current United Left.

^{#}In 1983, the People's Alliance (AP), Democratic Popular Party (PDP), Liberal Union (UL) and Valencian Union (UV) formed a four-party electoral alliance. The electoral alliance ended in 1986 and the AP and UV contested the 1987 local elections separately. In 1989 the AP merged with the PDP and UL to form the current People's Party.

^{†}Results for the Valencian People's Union, who later formed the Valencian Nationalist Bloc (BNV).

=== List of mayors ===
| Term | Name | Political party |
|---|---|---|
| 1979-1983 | Antonio Cubillos Royo | PSPV-PSOE |
| 1983-1987 | Antonio Cubillos Royo | PSPV-PSOE |
| 1987-1991 | Antonio Cubillos Royo | PSPV-PSOE |
| 1991-1995 | Antonio Cubillos Royo | PSPV-PSOE |
| 1995-1999 | Francisco Chirivella Peris | PP |
| 1999-2003 | Francisco Chirivella Peris | PP |
| 2003-2007 | Mª Ángeles López Sargues | UV |
| 2007-2011 | Francisco Chirivella Peris†; Soledad Ramón Sánchez | PP; PP |
| 2011-2015 | Soledad Ramón Sánchez | PP |
| 2015-2019 | Jesús Monzó Cubillos | Compromís |
| 2019-2023 | Jesús Monzó Cubillos | Compromís |
| 2023- | Lorena Silvent Ruiz | PSPV-PSOE |

== See also ==
- List of municipalities in Valencia
