= Sara Bermell =

Spanish footballer (born 2001)

Personal information
- Full name: Sara Martínez Bermell
- Date of birth: 16 September 2001 (age 25)
- Place of birth: Paiporta, Spain
- Position: Midfielder

Team information
- Current team: Villarreal
- Number: 28

Senior career*
Years	Team	Apps	(Gls)
2016–2017	Levante C		
2017–2020	Levante B	22+	(5+)
2020–	Villarreal	30	(2)
- * Club domestic league appearances and goals as of 22:38, 22 February 2022 (UTC)

Sara Martínez Bermell (born 16 September 2001) is a Spanish footballer who plays as a midfielder for Villarreal.

== Club career ==
Bermell started her career at Levante C.
