= Xirivella Award =

The Xirivella Award is a recognition created in 2006 by Xirivella town (Valencia - Spain) to honour its outstanding citizens. The city council holds a ceremony where their achievements are publicly recognised. There are three categories: individuals, companies and civil associations, and the winners are given the golden badge of the city.

== Awarded ==
Miquel Navarro Sorní (2006), Valencian Language Adademic and Doctor by the Gregorian Pontifician University of Rome.

Xirivella Traders Association (Asociación de Comerciantes Web) (2006)

Xirivella Market merchant Associaction (Asociación de Vendedores del Mercado) (2006)

Vicent J. Martinez, Astronomy professor in University of Valencia (2008)

Casa Toribio (2010).

Rafael Serrallet, guitarist (2010)

Radio Ramon Muntaner (2010)
