= Horta Oest =

Coordinates: 39°28′34″N 0°28′52″W

Horta Oest Huerta Oeste
- Comarca
- Country: Spain
- Autonomous community: Valencian Community
- Province: València / Valencia
- Capital and largest city: Torrent
- Municipalities: 9 municipalities: Alaquàs, Aldaia, Manises, Mislata, Paterna, Picanya, Quart de Poblet, Torrent, Xirivella

Area
  - Total: 178.74 km^{2} (69.01 sq mi)

Population (2006)
  - Total: 328,678
  - Density: 1,838.9/km^{2} (4,762.6/sq mi)
- Time zone: UTC+1 (CET)
  - Summer (DST): UTC+2 (CEST)

Horta Oest (Valencian: [ˈɔɾta oˈest], also [ˈɔɾtɔ oˈest]; Spanish: Huerta Oeste [ˈweɾta oˈeste]) was a comarca in the province of Valencia, Valencian Community, Spain.

== Municipalities ==
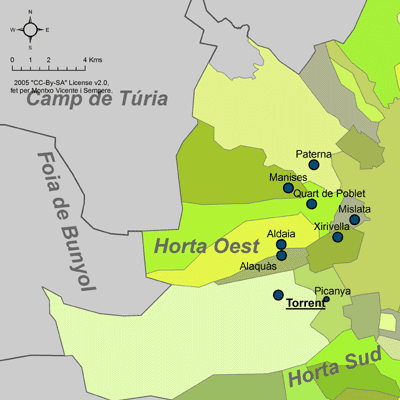
Municipalities of Horta Oest

- Alaquàs
- Aldaia
- Manises
- Mislata
- Paterna
- Picanya
- Quart de Poblet
- Torrent
- Xirivella
