= Horta of Valencia =

Horta of Valencia Horta de València
- Formerly: comarca Currently: urban and metro area
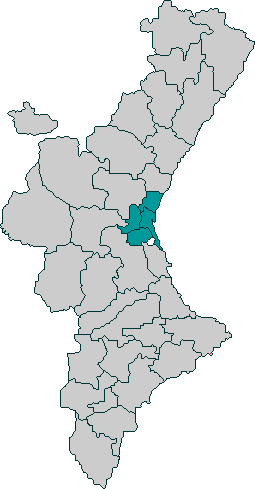
- Horta of Valencia on map of Valencian Community

- Location within Spain Location within European Union
- Coordinates: 39°28′N 0°22′W
- Country: Spain
- Autonomous community: Valencian Community
- Province: Valencia
- City and comarcas: Valencia, Horta Nord, Horta Sud, Horta Oest

Area
  - Total: 631.9 km^{2} (244.0 sq mi)

Population (2019)
  - Total: 1,567,118
  - Density: 2,480/km^{2} (6,400/sq mi)
- Demonym: Valencian

The Horta of Valencia (Valencian: Horta de València; Spanish: Huerta de Valencia) is a historical comarca of the Valencian Community, in Spain. Currently, Horta of Valencia is the common name and refers to the urban and metro area covered by Valencia (València) and three neighbouring comarques: Horta Nord, Horta Sud, Horta Oest.

== Administrative division ==
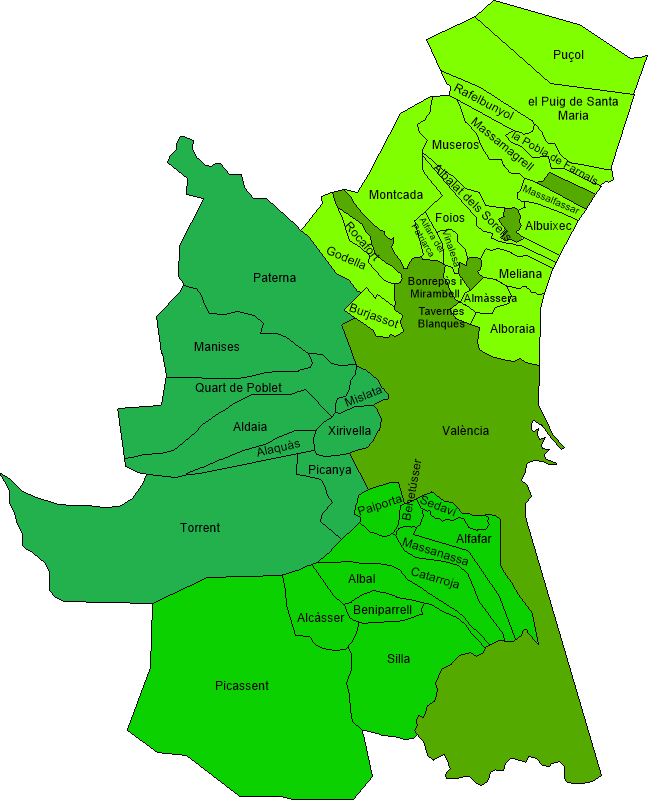
An administrative division of Horta of Valencia

Division of the Valencia Metro Area
Comarca	Population (2019)	Area	Density
City (municipality) of Valencia	801 545	134,7 km²	5853 /km²
Horta Oest (Western zone)	359 337	187,6 km²	1982 /km²
Horta Nord (North zone)	228 424	140,4 km²	1627 /km²
Horta Sud (South zone)	178 118	166,2 km²	1071 /km²
Total:	1 567 118	631,9 km²	2480 /km²

== Origin ==
Originally Valencia was founded as a base for Roman campaigns into Spain.

Traditional Arab irrigation systems were built in the Horta of Valencia during the Al-Andalus period; the historical irrigation system at the Horta of Valencia was named a Globally Important Agricultural Heritage Site in 2019.
