= Xirivella =

Xirivella Chirivella
- Town and municipality
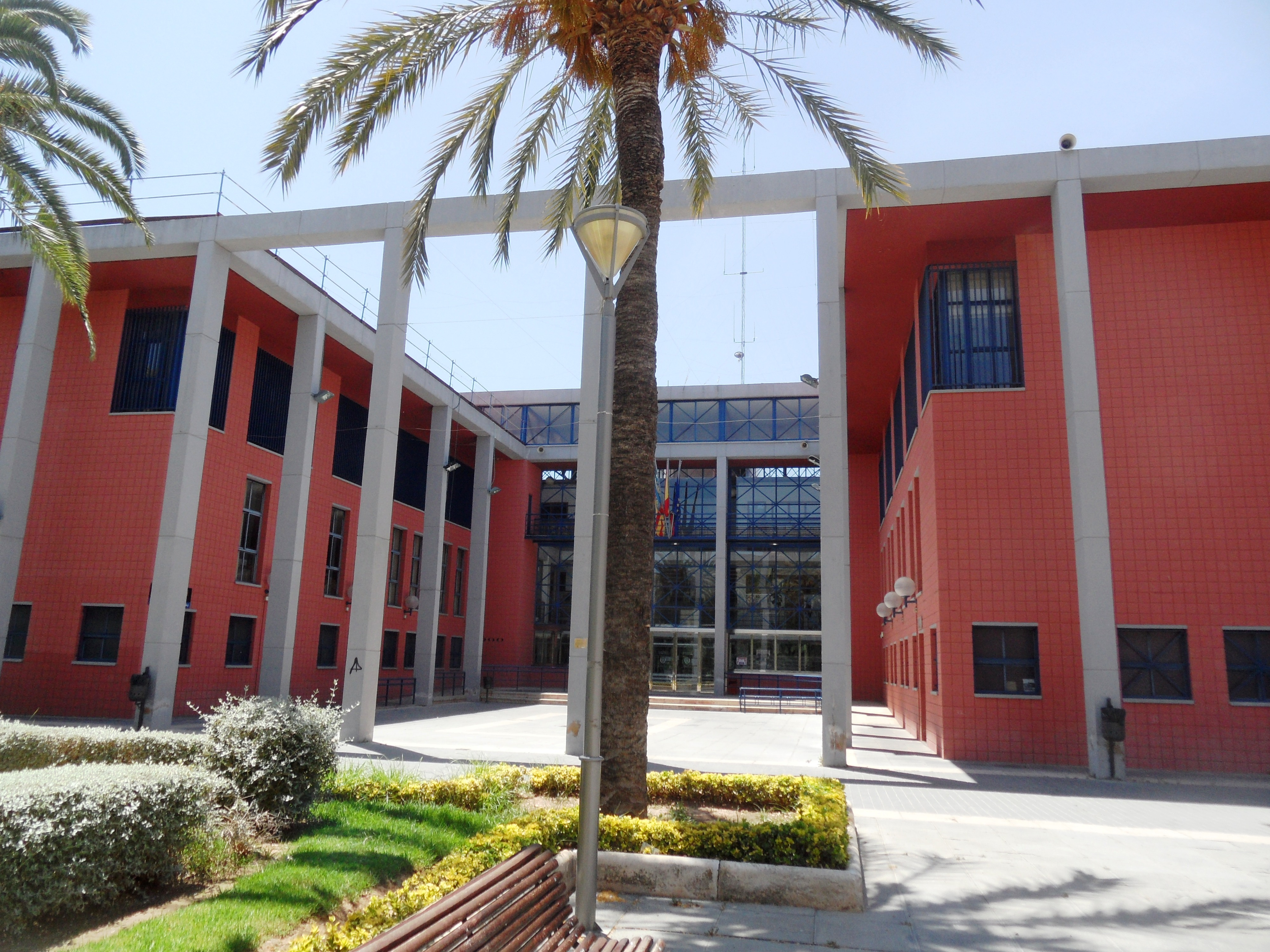
- Town hall of Xirivella

- Coat of arms

- Location of Xirivella in the Province of Valencia Location of Xirivella in the Valencian Community Location of Xirivella in Spain
- Coordinates: 39°27′56″N 0°25′36″W
- Country: Spain
- Autonomous community: Valencian Community
- Province: Valencia
- Comarca: Horta Oest
- Judicial district: Mislata

Government
  - Alcalde (Mayor): Francisca Bartual Bermell (2023-) (PP)

Area
  - Total: 5.2 km^{2} (2.0 sq mi)
- Elevation: 17 m (56 ft)

Population (2025-01-01)
  - Total: 32,093
  - Density: 6,200/km^{2} (16,000/sq mi)
- Demonyms: • xirivellenc, -a (Val.) • chirivellense (Sp.)
- Official language(s): Valencian; Spanish
- Linguistic area: Valencian
- Time zone: UTC+1 (CET)
  - Summer (DST): UTC+2 (CEST)
- Postal code: 46950
- Website: Official website

Xirivella, (Note: Pronunciation of Xirivella: Valencian: [tʃiɾiˈveʎa]) in Valencian, spelled Chirivella in Spanish, (Note: Pronunciation of Chirivella (unofficial): Spanish: [tʃiɾiˈβeʎa]) is a town and municipality in the Valencian Community, Spain. It borders the city of Valencia, Alaquàs, Picanya and Mislata. The municipality is divided by the V-30 motorway and the river Turia, with the La Luz district on the eastern part of the river. Since June 2012, a bridge across the motorway has connected both parts. Local issues include noise pollution, caused by the nearby Valencia Airport.

== Transport ==
It is connected to central Valencia by bus routes. The town's railway stations Xirivella-L'Alter and Xirivella-Alqueries have been inactive since April 2020 and January 2021 when service was suspended during the COVID-19 pandemic. L'Alter is expected to be dismantled while the future of Alqueries is uncertain. Metro links exist in the nearby town of Mislata. The proposed Line 14 of Metrovalencia is due to link the town to the rest of the metro network after 2030.

== Toponymy ==
The name Xirivella may come from the Latin word Silvella (little forest).

== History ==
Archeological remains have been found in Xirivella dating since Roman times.

During the Middle Ages the area was inhabited by farmers that cultivated the land. The silk industry also developed during this period.

Xirivella had a population of 32,093 inhabitants in 2025.

== Sister cities ==
Xirivella has town twinned with Casas de Benítez in Cuenca province (Spain), the Dunavarsány city of Hungary and the city of Habana Vieja in Cuba.

== Cultural heritage ==
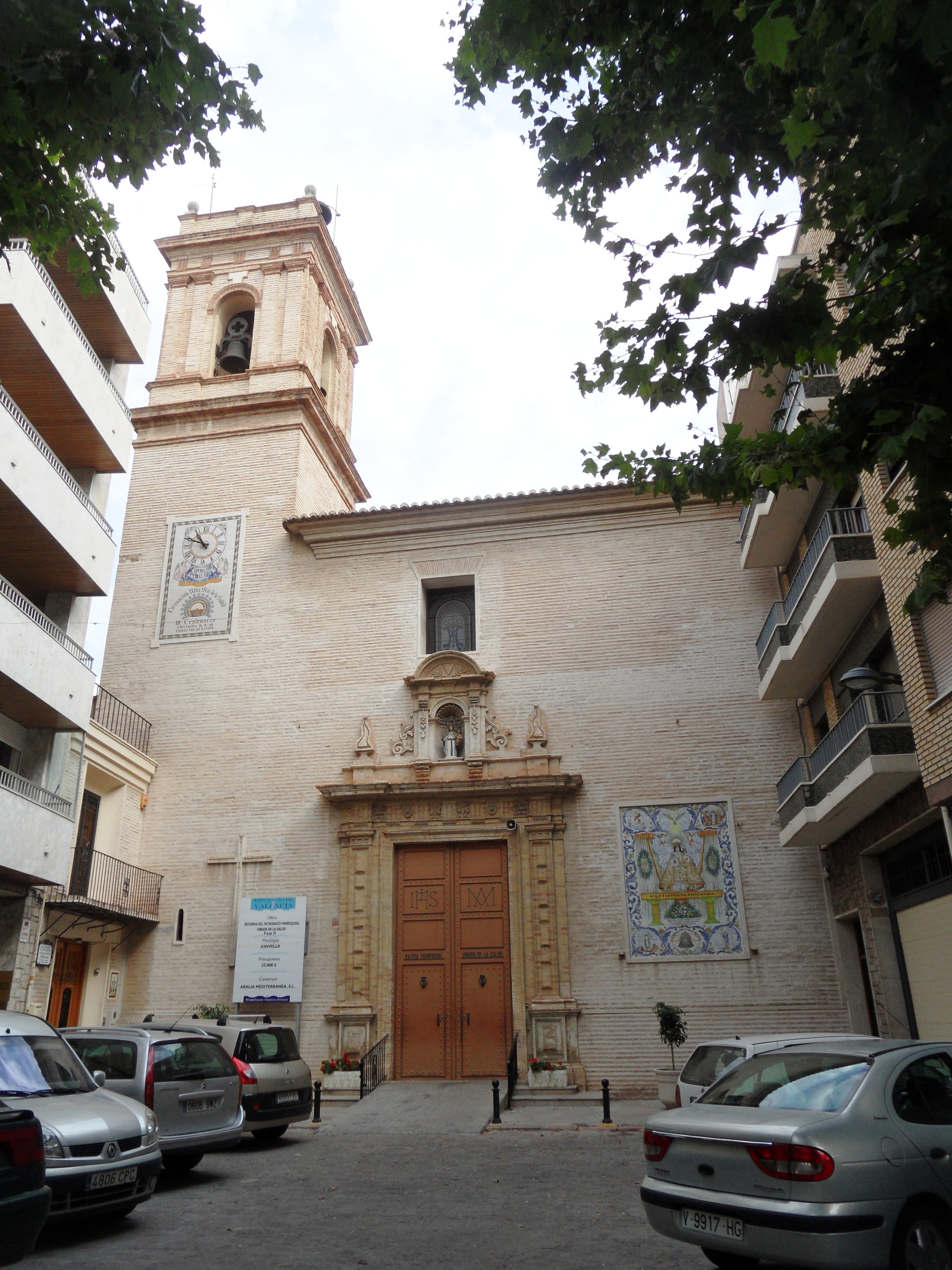
Virgen de la Salud Church

Xirivella's cultural heritage includes a number of buildings.

The old city maintains the urbanism from the Arabic era. This is a list of the main historical buildings:

- Virgen de la Salud Church (Església de la Verge de la Salut): The only parish until 1953. It was built at the end of the 17th century.

- Virgen de la Salud Chapel (Ermita de la Verge de la Salut)

- La Closa: 14th century building. It was restored in 2003.

- Dau House: 14th century building. It was the place where taxes could be paid.

- Tithe House (Casa del Delme): 14th century house, but it was demolished around 2000.

- Alquería del Castillo (Alqueria del Castell): It has also been demolished. It was located on the site of a Roman villa.

== Cultural life ==
Xirivella has a very active cultural life. There are several cultural associations that include the wind orchestra (banda) called CIM Xirivella, the choir (Escola Coral Andarella), the International Clowns Festival (Mostra Internacional de Pallassos), the music school, the Culture House where are held concerts, shows, exhibitions, and a theater. Xirivella also organize the Xirivella Award, a recognition to honor its outstanding citizens.

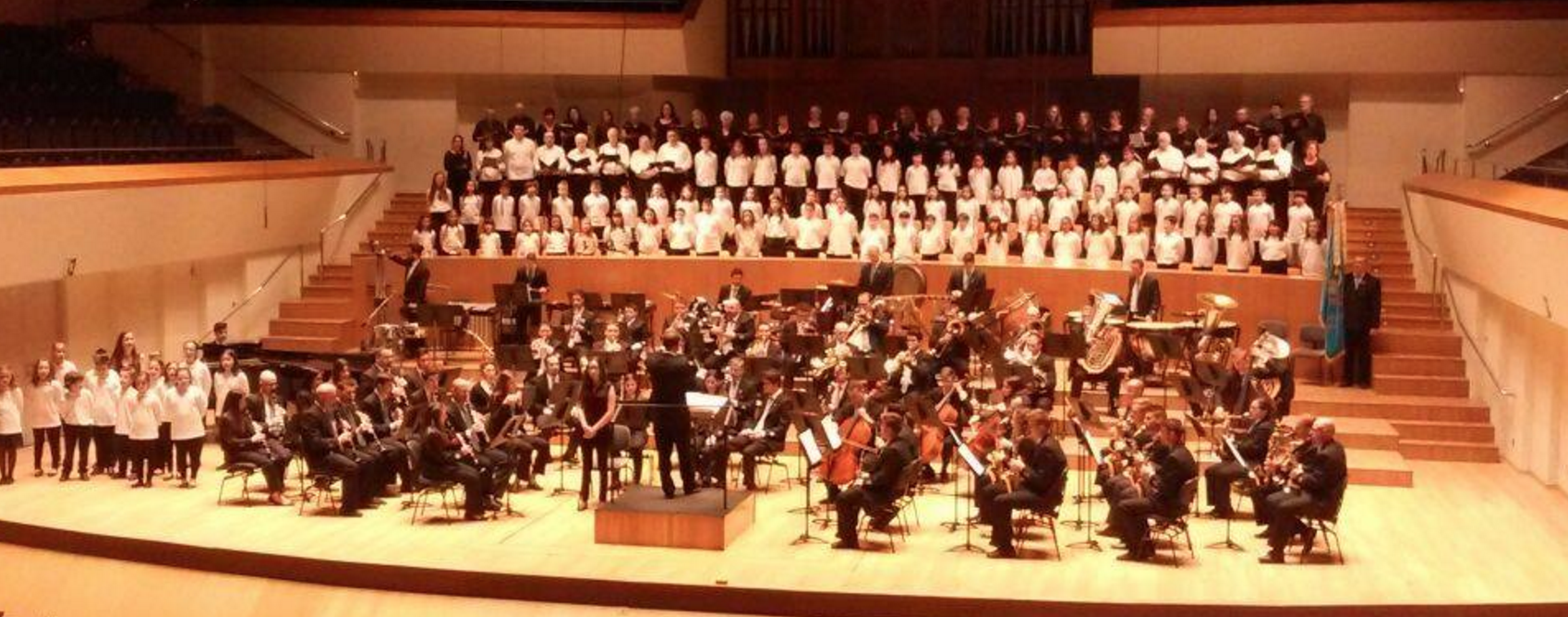
Banda del Círculo Instructivo Musical de Xirivella

== Local politics ==
The municipality had been governed by the Spanish Socialist Workers Party since the 1970s, either alone or with the support of United Left. However at the 2011 local elections, the People's Party won a majority of seats for the first time.

=== Summary of council election results ===
	1979	1983	1987	1991	1995	1999	2003	2007	2011	2015	2019	2023
Spanish Socialist Workers' Party (PSOE)	8	13	10	11	9	11	10	10	7	6	9	9
United Left (IU)	7	3	2	2	3	2	3	2	2	1		
Union of the Democratic Centre (UCD)	6											
People's Party (PP)		5	2	3	8	8	8	9	11	7	7	9
Valencian Union (UV)		5	2	1								
Xirivella Independent Platform (PIX)			3	4	1							
Democratic and Social Centre (CDS)			2									
Coalició Compromís (Compromís)									1	4	2	1
Podemos (Podemos)										3	1	
Citizens (Cs)											2	
Vox (Vox)												2
Total number of seats	21	21	21	21	21	21	21	21	21	21	21	21

== See also ==
- List of municipalities in Valencia
