= Paiporta =

- Town and municipality
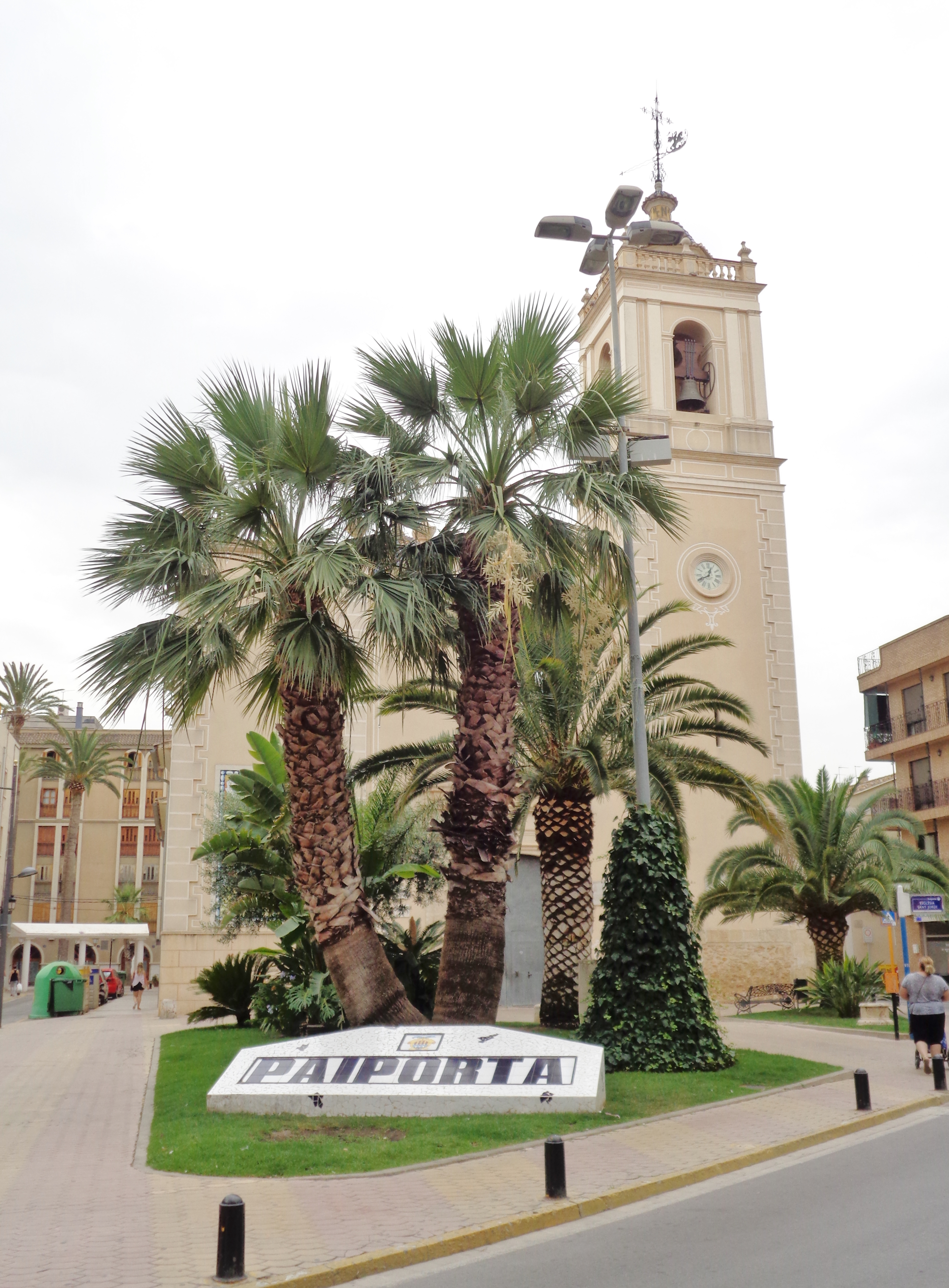

- Coat of arms

- Location in Spain Paiporta (Valencian Community) Paiporta (Spain)
- Coordinates: 39°25′40″N 0°25′6″W
- Country: Spain
- Autonomous community: Valencian Community
- Province: Valencia
- Comarca: Horta Sud
- Founded: 1676

Government
  - Alcaldessa (Mayoress): Maria Isabel Albalat Asensi (PSPV-PSOE)

Area
  - Total: 3.9 km^{2} (1.5 sq mi)
- Elevation: 23 m (75 ft)

Population (2025-01-01)
  - Total: 28,136
  - Density: 7,200/km^{2} (19,000/sq mi)
- Demonyms: Paiportan • paiportí, -ina (Val.) • paiportino/a (Sp.)
- Official language(s): Valencian; Spanish
- Linguistic area: Valencian
- Time zone: UTC+1 (CET)
  - Summer (DST): UTC+2 (CEST)
- Postal code: 46200
- Website: Official website

Paiporta (Note: Pronunciation of Paiporta: Valencian: [pajˈpɔɾta], also [pajˈpɔɾtɔ]; Spanish: [pajˈpoɾta]) is a town and municipality of Spain belonging to the province of Valencia and the Valencian Community. It is part of the comarca of Horta Sud.

Paiporta was billed as the ground zero of the October 2024 floods affecting the province of Valencia. In the town, 45 inhabitants died. In the case of Paiporta and other municipalities of the Valencia metropolitan area, damage was caused by the overflow of the Rambla del Poyo.

== Twin towns ==
Paiporta is twinned with:

- Soliera, Italy

== Notable people ==
- Sara Bermell (born 2001), footballer

== See also ==
- List of municipalities in Valencia
