= Aldaia =

Aldaia Aldaya
- Municipality
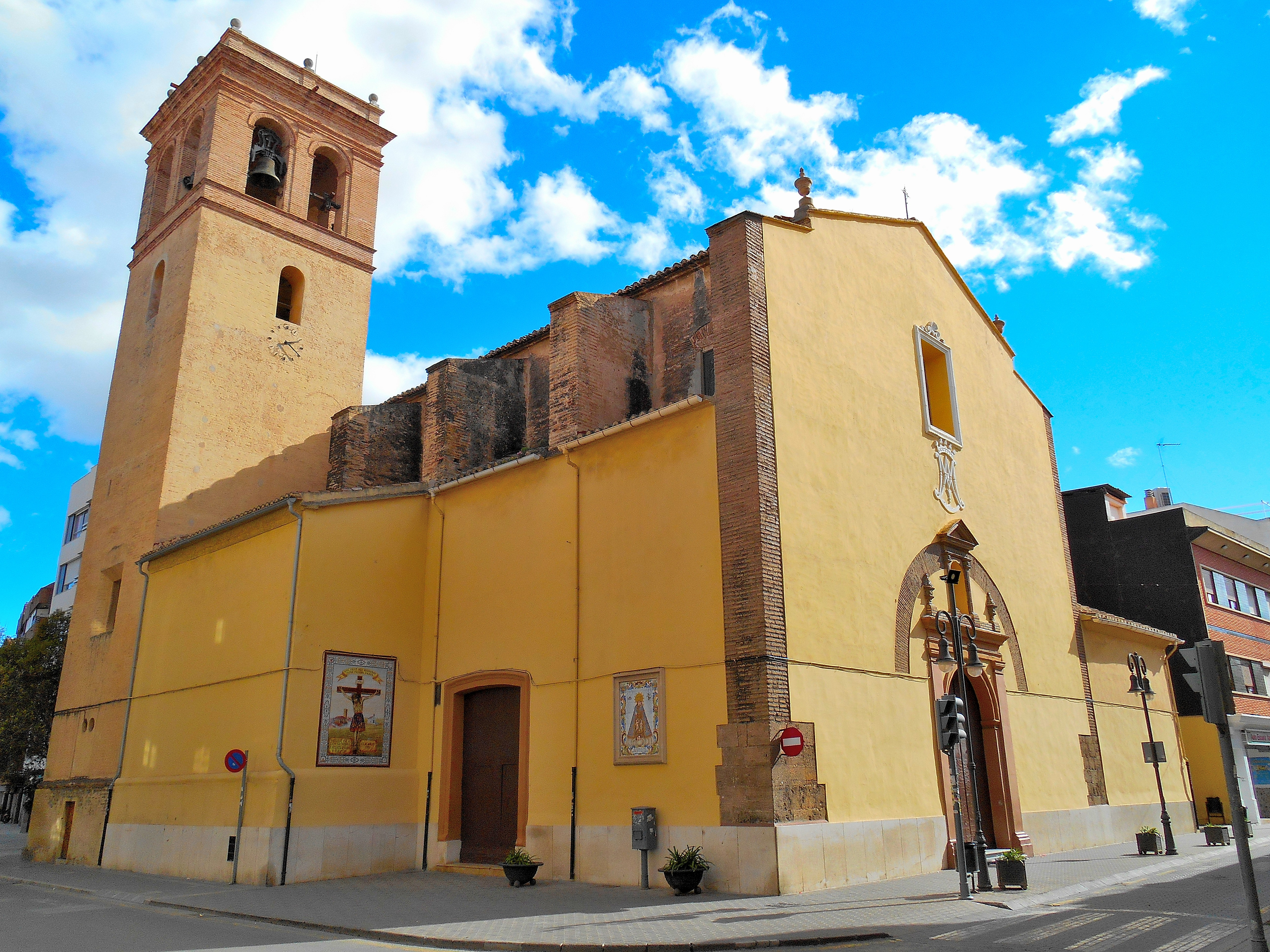

- Coat of arms

- Location in Spain Aldaia (Valencian Community) Aldaia (Spain)
- Coordinates: 39°27′50″N 0°27′46″W
- Country: Spain
- Autonomous community: Valencian Community
- Province: València / Valencia
- Comarca: Horta Oest
- Judicial district: Torrent

Government
  - Mayor: Guillermo Luján Valero (2023) (PSPV-PSOE)

Area
  - Total: 16.1 km^{2} (6.2 sq mi)
- Elevation: 50 m (160 ft)

Population (2025-01-01)
  - Total: 34,630
  - Density: 2,150/km^{2} (5,570/sq mi)
- Demonyms: • aldaier, -a (Val.) • aldayense (Sp.)
- Official language(s): Valencian; Spanish
- Linguistic area: Valencian
- Time zone: UTC+1 (CET)
  - Summer (DST): UTC+2 (CEST)
- Postal code: 46960
- Website: www.aldaia-ajuntament.es

Aldaia, (Note: Pronunciation of Aldaia: Valencian: [alˈdaja]) in Valencian, spelled Aldaya in Spanish, (Note: Pronunciation of Aldaya (unofficial): Spanish: [alˈdaʝa]) is a town and municipality in the comarca of Horta Oest, province of Valencia, Valencian Community, Spain.

== Local politics ==
Aldaia is located in l'Horta, an area known as the red belt (Valencian: cinturó roig, Spanish: cinturón rojo) due to its tendency to vote for left wing parties. Until 2011, all elections with the exception of 1995 produced an absolute majority for the Spanish Socialist Workers' Party (PSOE). The People's Party won a majority at the 2011 local elections. A PSOE-led administration was formed after the 2015 elections, and the PSOE regained its absolute majority in 2019 and held it in 2023.

=== Summary of council seats won ===
	1979	1983	1987	1991	1995	1999	2003	2007	2011	2015	2019	2023
Spanish Socialist Workers' Party (PSOE)	8	12	13	14	10	12	13	11	8	8	14	14
Union of the Democratic Centre (UCD)	6											
United Left (IU)	5^{*}	3^{*}	2	2	3	1	1	1	1	1		
Independents	2											
People's Party (PP)		3^{#}	3^{#}	3	6	7	7	9	11	4	3	4
Valencian Union (UV)		3^{#}		2	2	1						
Democratic and Social Centre (CDS)		3	3									
Coalició Compromís (Compromís)									1	2	1	1
Podemos (CET)										3		
Citizens (C's)										3	3	
Vox (Vox)												2
Total number of seats	21											

^{*}Results for the Communist Party of Spain. In 1986 they joined with other parties to form the current United Left.

^{#}In 1983, the People's Alliance (AP), Democratic Popular Party (PDP), Liberal Union (UL) and Valencian Union (UV) formed a four-party electoral alliance. The electoral alliance ended in 1986 and the AP and UV contested the 1987 local elections separately. In 1989 the AP merged with the PDP and UL to form the current People's Party.

== Notable people ==
- Voltor — ska/rock band

== See also ==
- Bacchus of Aldaia
- List of municipalities in Valencia
