= Picanya =

- Municipality
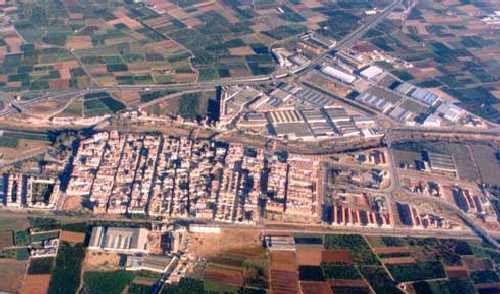

- Coat of arms

- Location in Spain
- Coordinates: 39°26′10″N 0°26′6″W
- Country: Spain
- Autonomous community: Valencian Community
- Province: Valencia
- Comarca: Horta Oest
- Judicial district: Torrente

Government
  - Alcalde: Josep Almenar i Navarro

Area
  - Total: 7.1 km^{2} (2.7 sq mi)
- Elevation: 15 m (49 ft)

Population (2025-01-01)
  - Total: 11,901
  - Density: 1,700/km^{2} (4,300/sq mi)
- Demonym: Picañero/a
- Time zone: UTC+1 (CET)
  - Summer (DST): UTC+2 (CEST)
- Postal code: 46210
- Official language(s): Valencian
- Website: Official website

Picanya (Valencian pronunciation: [piˈkaɲa]) is a municipality in the comarca of Horta Sud in the Valencian Community, Spain.

== Summary of council election results ==
The Spanish Socialist Workers' Party has had an absolute majority of seats since the restoration of democracy in the late 1970s.

	1979	1983	1987	1991	1995	1999	2003	2007	2011	2015	2019	2023
Spanish Socialist Workers' Party (PSOE)	12	9	9	10	8	9	9	9	9	9	11	9
United Left (IU)	1				1			1				
People's Party (PP)		4	4	3	4	4	4	7	7	3	2	4
Valencian Union (UV)		4										
Coalició Compromís (Compromís)									1	3	2	3
Citizens (Cs)										2	2	
Vox (Vox)												1
Total number of seats	13	13	13	13	13	13	13	17	17	17	17	17

== See also ==
- List of municipalities in Valencia
