= Linguistic areas of the Valencian Community =

Linguistics

The linguistic areas of the Valencian Community are Valencian (Catalan) and Spanish. According to Valencian law, predomini lingüístic, (Note: Pronunciation in Valencian: [pɾeðoˈmini liŋˈɡwistik]) in Valencian, or predominio lingüístico, (Note: Pronunciation in Spanish: [pɾeðoˈminjo liŋˈɡwistiko]) in Spanish, (lit. 'linguistic predominance', "linguistic prevalence") is a legal classification established in 1983 in the Valencian Community (Note: Also known as Valencian Country.) to divide municipalities according to the historically dominant language of the local population: Valencian or Spanish. It is established by Valencian law and is used for administrative and educational purposes. Regardless of the main used language, both languages remain official in the whole Valencian Community.

Beyond its legal implications, the concept is also used in Valencian sociolinguistics as a geographical delimitation of the areas where each language has been dominant in recent times in order to analyze current usage patterns. The concept does not necessarily reflect current patterns of language use within a municipality, since the Valencian territory as linguistically heterogeneous, with significant variation in language use and a broader context of diglossia between Valencian and Spanish.

There are 395 municipalities with Valencian predominance and 147 with Spanish predominance. The Valencian predominance area includes the four largest cities and about 80% of the population.

== History ==
The areas of Valencian prevalence correspond broadly to those settled by Catalans following the Conquest of Valencia in the 13th century by the Crown of Aragon, while the Spanish areas correspond to those settled by Aragonese or Castilians, as well as municipalities such as Requena and Villena that were historically part of the Kingdom of Castile and were added to the Valencian Country in the 19th Century.

After years of persecution of local languages under Francoism, the Spanish Constitution of 1978 allowed the creation of autonomous communities, which could designate their own official languages. The Valencian Community achieved autonomy in 1982 and Valencian and Spanish were made official, with Valencian having llengua pròpia (native language) status. The statute also established that

The territories in which the use of one language or the other predominates will be delimited by law, as well as those that may be exempted from the teaching and use of the Community's native language.

Law 4/1983 on the Use and Teaching of Valencian defined the delimitation in 1983, making teaching of Valencian optional in the Spanish-speaking territories. Although the law provided for the "review" of the border and the "progressive introduction" of Valencian in schools in those territories, the classification has not been updated since its initial approval, and Valencian remains an optional subject in Spanish speaking municipalities.

== Linguistic areas ==
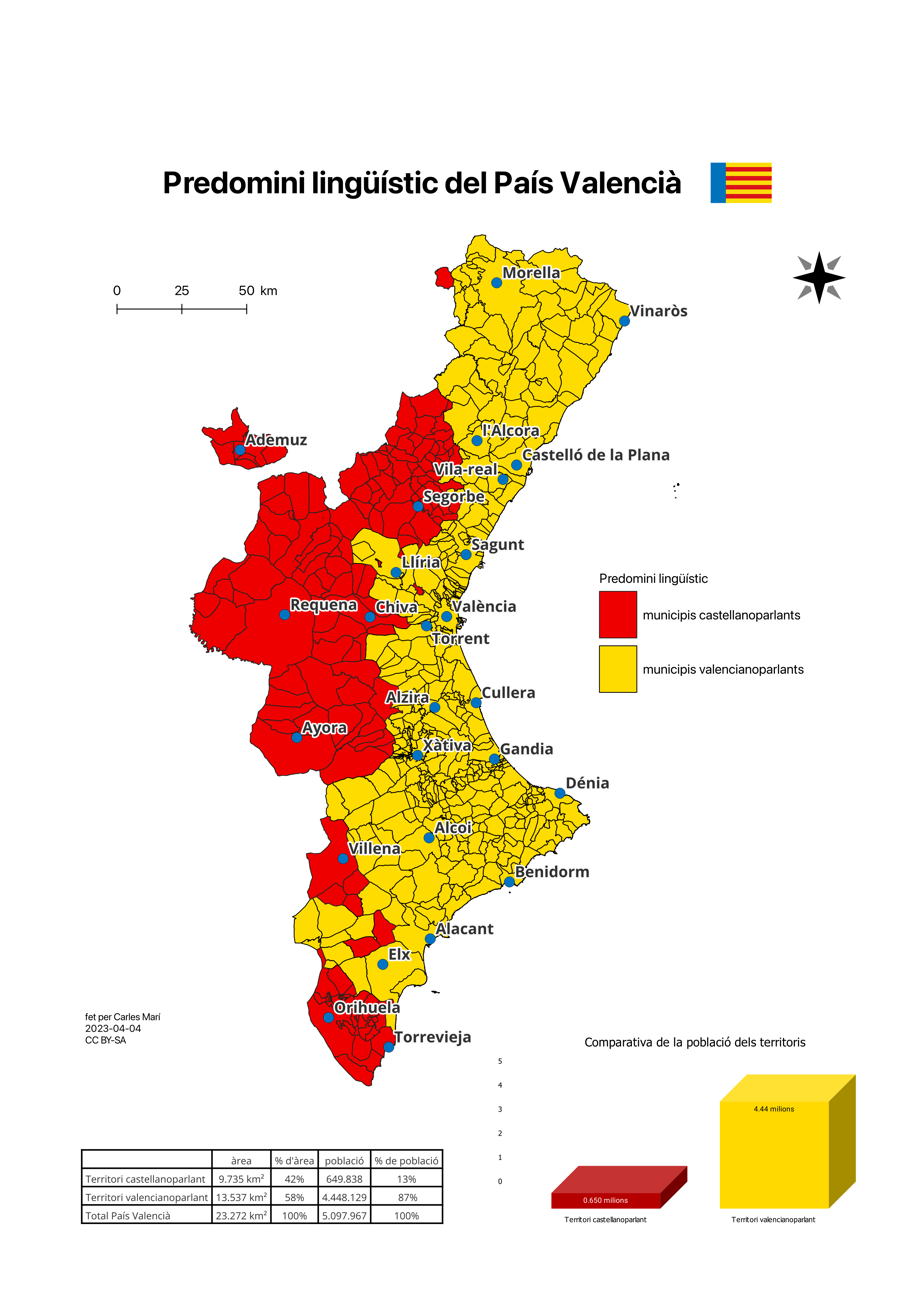
Area of Spanish linguistic predominance (red) and Valencian linguistic predominance (yellow)

=== Valencian ===
The Valencian language is traditionally spoken along the coast and in some inland areas in the provinces of Alicante and Castellón, from Vinaròs (northernmost point of the extension of Valencian on the coast of the Valencian Community) to Guardamar (southernmost point of Valencian). (Note: Historically, the southernmost point of Valencian in the Kingdom of Valencia was Orihuela (Oriola). It was also spoken in further areas in Murcia (including the area of Cartagena); however, it became extinct in the majority of the region.) Additionally, it is also spoken by a small number of people in the Carche comarca, a rural area in the Region of Murcia adjoining the Valencian Community. Nevertheless, Valencian does not have any official recognition in this area.

Valencian shares similar phonetic and lexical features with the Western Catalan dialects (spoken in Andorra, La Franja, Lleida and southern Tarragona).

Features of the Valencian language (see Valencian dialects) includes vowel harmony (with /ɛ/ and/or /ɔ/): tela [ˈtɛlɛ] 'fabric, cloth' and hora [ˈɔɾɔ] 'hour' (see Valencian vowel harmony, for an in-depth explanation), frequent /d/ [ð] elision between vowels following a stressed syllable (found notably in feminine participles, -ada /ada/ → [aː], phon. [ɑː], and in the suffix -dor); e.g., vegada [veˈɣaː] 'time, occasion', mocador [mokaˈoɾ] 'tissue', preservation of the /v/ phoneme (e.g., viu [ˈviw] 'he/she lives'), tendency to affrication (of g, before e and i, and j /d͡ʒ/: dijous [diˈd͡ʒɔws] 'Thursday'; and x /t͡ʃ/: xoc [ˈt͡ʃɔk] 'shock', especially in initial and post-consonantal position), pronunciation of yod (i.e., /j/) before /ʃ/ in the digraph ix (in most dialects): peix [ˈpejʃ] 'fish', preservation of n (/n/) in the plural of certain terms with etymological n (hòmens [pl.] 'men' vs. home [s.] 'man'; c.f., Latin homines vs. homo), deaffrication of tz (/d͡z/ → [z]: horitzó [oɾiˈzo] 'horizon') in most cases (especially the -itzar suffix, and derivations); exception: setze [ˈsed͡ze] 'sixteen', the reduction of the -esa suffix to -ea (bellesa → bellea 'beauty') in some contexts in some Valencian dialects, etymological spelling and pronunciation of orde 'order' and murta 'myrtle' (instead of ordre and murtra), historical pronunciation of jo 'I' and ja 'already' with yod (/j/),, preservation of /a/ in terms like nadar 'to swim' and traure 'to take out' (instead of nedar and treure), etymological spelling and pronunciation of colp 'hit' and polp 'octopus' (instead of cop and pop), no vocalic assimilation in redó 'round' and fenoll 'fennel' (instead of rodó and fonoll), and the suffix -ista is pronounced [-iste] in the masculine form, thus guitarrista 'guitarrist' is [ɡitaˈrista] in feminine and [ɡitaˈriste] in masculine (in Catalan both are [ɡitəˈristə]). Common specific lexicon includes: granera ('broom'), xiquet ('boy'), espill ('mirror'), corder ('lamb'), etc.

=== Spanish ===
Unlike in other bilingual autonomous communities, Valencian has not historically been spoken to the same extent throughout the Valencian Community. Slightly more than a quarter of its territory, equivalent to 10-15% of the population (its inland and southernmost areas), is Spanish-speaking since the Middle Ages. Over 38.9% of Valencia's population comes from Spanish-speaking communities post-20th century migrations.

The Spanish spoken in the Valencian Community (especially the one spoken by bilingual speakers and those with a high level of Valencian proficiency) is regarded as near or very near to standard Spanish. Spanish has prestige amongst most citizens in the Valencian Community. It is not perceived a wide perception of heterogenity in the Spanish of this territory, except for younger generations (18-35 years), who assert that Spanish differs between provinces. It is preferred standard Spanish than Northern and Southern Peninsular, and Valencian Spanish is regarded as the most preferred one.

Features of the Spanish language (more frequently called Castilian): Spanish spoken in the cities is little affected by Valencian and features distinción; i.e., the differentiation of /s/ (s) and /θ/ (c before e and i, and z): casa [ˈkasa] 'house' vs. caza [ˈkaθa] 'hunting', and yeísmo (the merger of /ʎ/–ll in Spanish orthography–into /ʝ/, represented as y): halla 'he/she finds' and haya 'beech'; both pronounced as [ˈaʝa] (instead of [ˈaʎa] vs. [ˈaʝa]). In the south of the Valencian Community, dialects similar to neighbouring Murcian Spanish are spoken, featuring both distinción and seseo (the merger of /θ/ into /s/), depending on the speaker and area, and in some cases lleísmo (that is, the contrast of [ʎ] vs. [ʝ]). In the east, traits in common with the Spanish of either Aragon or La Mancha are found in the local Spanish.

== Modern language shift ==
Due to tourism and mass immigration several cities and towns towns have changed their main spoken language to Spanish; however, Valencian remains the historical and official language. Examples are cities like Alicante, Elche and Valencia where Valencian is currently in decline.

=== English ===
English in the Valencian Community plays a key role in multilingual education, teacher accreditation and official training through the Official Language Schools, Valencian: Escoles Oficials d'Idiomes (EOI), and public universities.

==== English-speaking areas ====
- San Fulgencio, a traditional Spanish-speaking town in the province of Alicante within the Valencian Community, has a unique demographic profile where 77.7% of the population is now of foreign origin, according to the 2011 Census, with the latest estimates around 9,769 residents. Among these residents, English is the predominant language, reflecting the large number of British expatriates and other English-speaking foreigners living in the town.
- In Benidorm, a popular resort city for northern Europeans in Alicante, English (along with Spanish and Valencian) is amongst the most spoken local languages.

== Educational programs ==
Current educational regulations in the Valencian Community are governed mainly by Law 1/2024, of 27 June, on Educational Freedom, which modifies the historical model of the Law on the Use and Teaching of the Valencian Language, or Valencian: Llei d'Us i Ensenyament del Valencià (LUEV), of 1983 and repeals the previous multilingual law of 2018.

The Law of Educational Freedom (Valencian: Llei de Llibertat Educativa) allows families (parents or tutors) to choose the primary language of instruction (Valencian or Spanish) during the compulsory education stages. This system replaced the previous plurilingualism model and is organized around percentages of language use as the medium of instruction, as defined by the Department of Education (Conselleria d'Educació).

- Freedom of choice: The proportions of Valencian and Spanish used as languages of instruction in the classroom aim to reflect the sociolinguistic reality and allow families to make a choice.
- Plurilingual competence: Curricula ensure balanced proficiency in both co-official languages by the end of the school years, while also incorporating a foreign language such as English.

=== Educational models ===
The linguistic models in the Valencian Community are mainly organized around the multilingual educational model, the normative model of the language (standard) and the sociolinguistic reality of official bilingualism. These models define both the vehicular use in schools and the way Valencian is spoken and written.

- Programa d’Incorporació Progressiva (PIP).
  - Vehicular language: Spanish is used as the main learning axis.
  - Introduction of Valencian: Valencian is gradually added as a subject and as a vehicle for some subjects to achieve balanced bilingualism.
  - Application: Intended for educational centres located in Spanish-speaking areas or as a teaching line in mixed areas according to previous regulations.
- Programa d'Ensenyament en Valencià (PEV) is an educational plan designed to use Valencian as the vehicular base language in teaching, thus guaranteeing bilingual competence and linguistic normalization in the school system.
  - Vehicular language: Use Valencian as the main tool for learning and communication in the classroom.
  - Linguistic competence: Ensure mastery of both Valencian and Spanish at the end of the educational stage.
  - Normalization: Integrate the culture and the native language (i.e., Valencian) from early childhood and primary education.
- Programa d'Immersió Lingüística (PIL). The language immersion program is aimed at students in 6th grade of Primary Education, Valencian: Educació Primària, and 2nd grade of Compulsory Secondary Education, Valencian: Educació Secundària Obligatòria (ESO), in order to improve communicative competence through groups of 20 to 25 students.
  - Linguistic competence: Promote the use and mastery of official languages in the school environment.
  - Cohesion: Promote the integration and equal opportunities of students through the uninterrupted practice of the immersion language.

== Bibliography ==
- Mayor Rocher, Marina; Gómez Seibane, Sara, El castellano en la Comunidad Valenciana: una variedad de prestigio (in Spanish), Universidad Autónoma de Madrid & Universidad de La Rioja
- Saborit Vilar, Josep (2009), Millorem la pronúncia [Let's improve the pronunciation], Recerca (in Valencian), vol. 11, Acadèmia Valenciana de la Llengua
- Sanchis Guarner, Manuel, La frontera lingüística en las provincias de Alicante y Murcia (PDF) (in Spanish)
