= C-1 (Cercanías Valencia) =

Railway line in Valencia, Spain

Line C-1

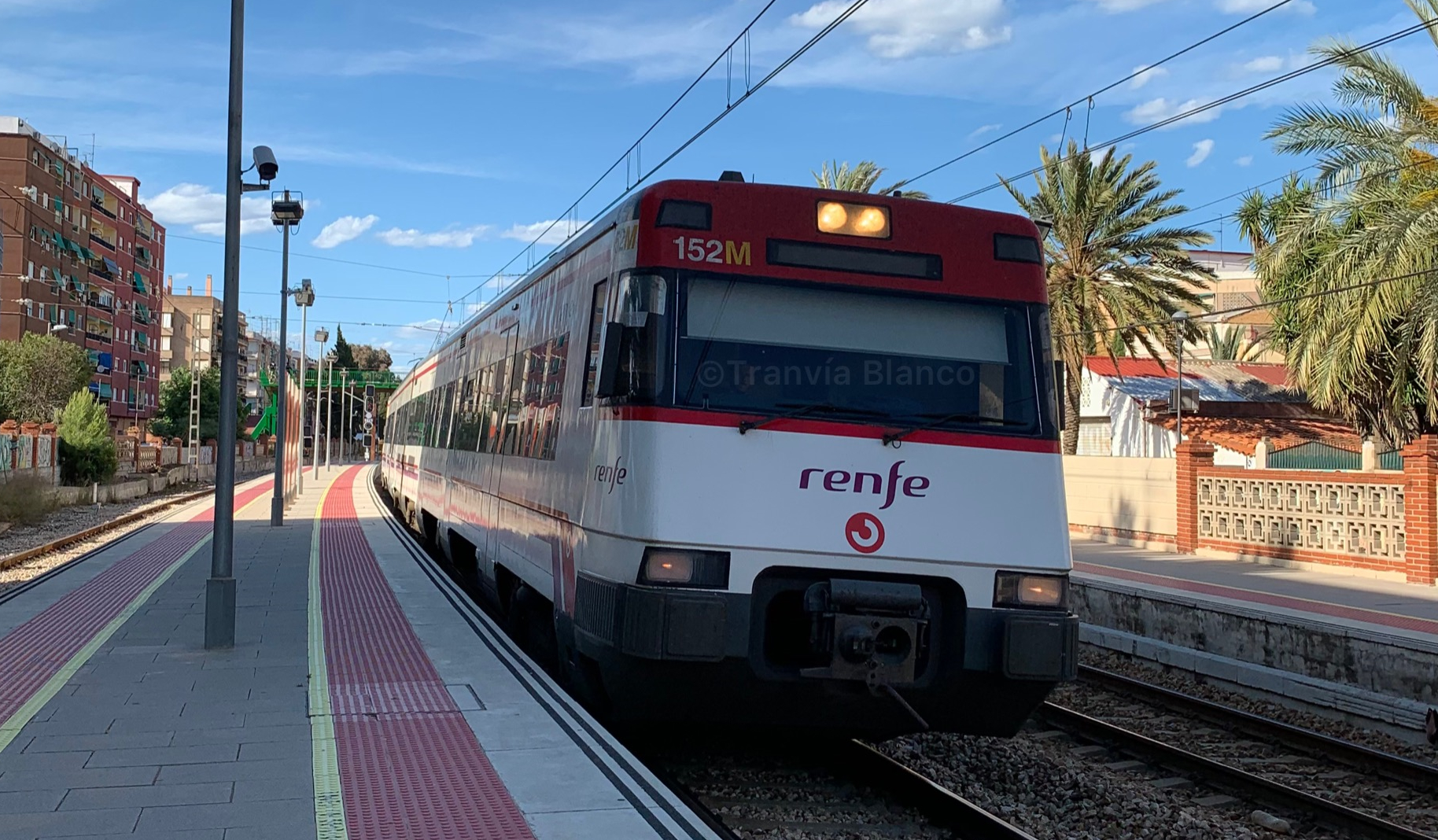

Overview
- Service type: Commuter service

Route
- Termini: Valencia North Station; Gandia Station; Grau de Gandia
- Distance travelled: 63 km
- Electrification: Yes

The C-1 line of Cercanías Valencia covers 63 km across the province of Valencia (Valencian Community, Spain), between Valencia Nord and Gandía or Grao de Gandía. It serves the municipalities of Valencia, Alfafar, Benetússer, Massanassa, Catarroja, Albal, Silla, Sollana, Sueca, Cullera, Tavernes de la Valldigna, Xeraco, and Gandia.

== Route ==
Stop		Km	Cercanías transfers
Valencia Nord		0	Line C-2 (Cercanías Valencia) Line C-3 (Cercanías Valencia) Line C-5 (Cercanías Valencia) Line C-6 (Cercanías Valencia)
Alfafar-Benetússer		5.11	Line C-2 (Cercanías Valencia)
Massanassa		6.64	Line C-2 (Cercanías Valencia)
Catarroja		7.66	Line C-2 (Cercanías Valencia)
Albal		8.51	Line C-2 (Cercanías Valencia)
Silla		12.12	Line C-2 (Cercanías Valencia)
El Romaní		18.92	—
Sollana		21.96	—
Sueca		32.12	—
Cullera		37.28	—
Tavernes de la Valldigna		49.1	—
Xeraco		55.61	—
Gandia	Grau de Gandia	62.92	—

Starting from Valencia Nord station, the line heads south on the common track shared with other lines until it joins the La Encina-Valencia line of the Mediterranean Corridor. In this section, which is shared with the C-2 line, it passes through the southern orchard area with stations in Benetúser (near the division between Benetúser and Alfafar), Massanassa, Catarroja, and Silla.

After Silla, it takes the Silla-Gandia railway line, separating from the C-2 line, and continues its journey southeast, close to the coast. The first municipality before entering the Albufera area is Sollana, with a station in the district of El Romaní and another station near the town center. It then travels through a 6 km stretch within the Albufera Natural Park until it reaches Sueca, where the next station is located.

The next municipality crossed by the line with a station is Cullera, where the station is situated near the N-332 road, west of the town center. From here, the line transitions from double track to single track and runs parallel to the coastline. The next station is between the town center and the beach of Tavernes de la Valldigna.

The line continues its journey and enters the urban area of Xeraco, where the next station is located in a tunnel section. After this municipality, it enters the municipality of Gandía.

Upon crossing the San Nicolás River in the urban area of Gandia, the line splits into two. On one side, the main line continues towards the city center of Gandía underground, terminating at the central intermodal station of the municipality. On the other side, a single-track branch originally used for transporting goods from the port is used by some trains to reach the new station located in the center of Grau de Gandia, between the beaches of Gandia and Daimús, where the line also ends.

== History ==
The section of the La Encina-Valencia line on which the C-1 line runs was opened to the public in 1852.

As for the Silla-Gandia line, it originally had a narrow-gauge track, connecting Cullera with Silla in 1878. In turn, Gandia was connected to Carcaixent by a mule tram since 1864 (in 1881 it became a narrow-gauge line connecting it to Dénia, and with Alcoy from 1893, also in narrow gauge, built with English capital). Between 1968 and 1972, coinciding with the closure of the Carcaixent-Gandía narrow-gauge line in 1969 (which also disconnected it from Alcoy that year due to the closure of its line), the track was extended between Cullera and Gandía (previously, the Silla-Cullera line had been converted to standard gauge in 1933), allowing direct connection with Valencia without transfer since 1972. The track was finally duplicated in the Silla-Cullera section, and the entire line was electrified in 1994. At the same time, the line was undergrounded in Xeraco and Gandia, creating the underground stations that are currently in operation.

In this way, in 1992, the C-1 line was incorporated into the Cercanías Valencia network with its current route and stations.

== Extensions ==
The construction of a tunnel through the city of Valencia is planned, which will allow the C-1 line, as well as the rest of the lines, to access the central station through the northern part of the city. This new station will replace the current Valencia Nord terminal and will include new stops such as València-Estació d'Aragó or València-Universitats. An agreement was also reached between the Valencian Government and the Ministry of Development in July 2009, which involves extending the line to the towns of Oliva, Ondara, and Dénia, creating connections with the FGV lines in Alicante.

The construction of a new station in Albal was completed in 2024. It opened serving lines C-1 and C-2 in February 2025, following the 2024 Spanish floods.

== Services and Frequencies ==
Not all trains stop at all stations. Only 1 out of every 2 trains stop at El Romaní, and the overall frequency of the line is 20–30 minutes. In the case of trains heading to Playa and Grao de Gandía, there are only 3 trains in each direction per day.

== CIVIS ==
CIVIS trains that run on the C-1 line in both directions only stop at the stations of Sueca, Cullera, Tavernes, and Xeraco, in addition to their terminal stations, Gandia and Valencia.
