= Revolt of the Barretinas =

Catalan revolt against King Charles II of Spain

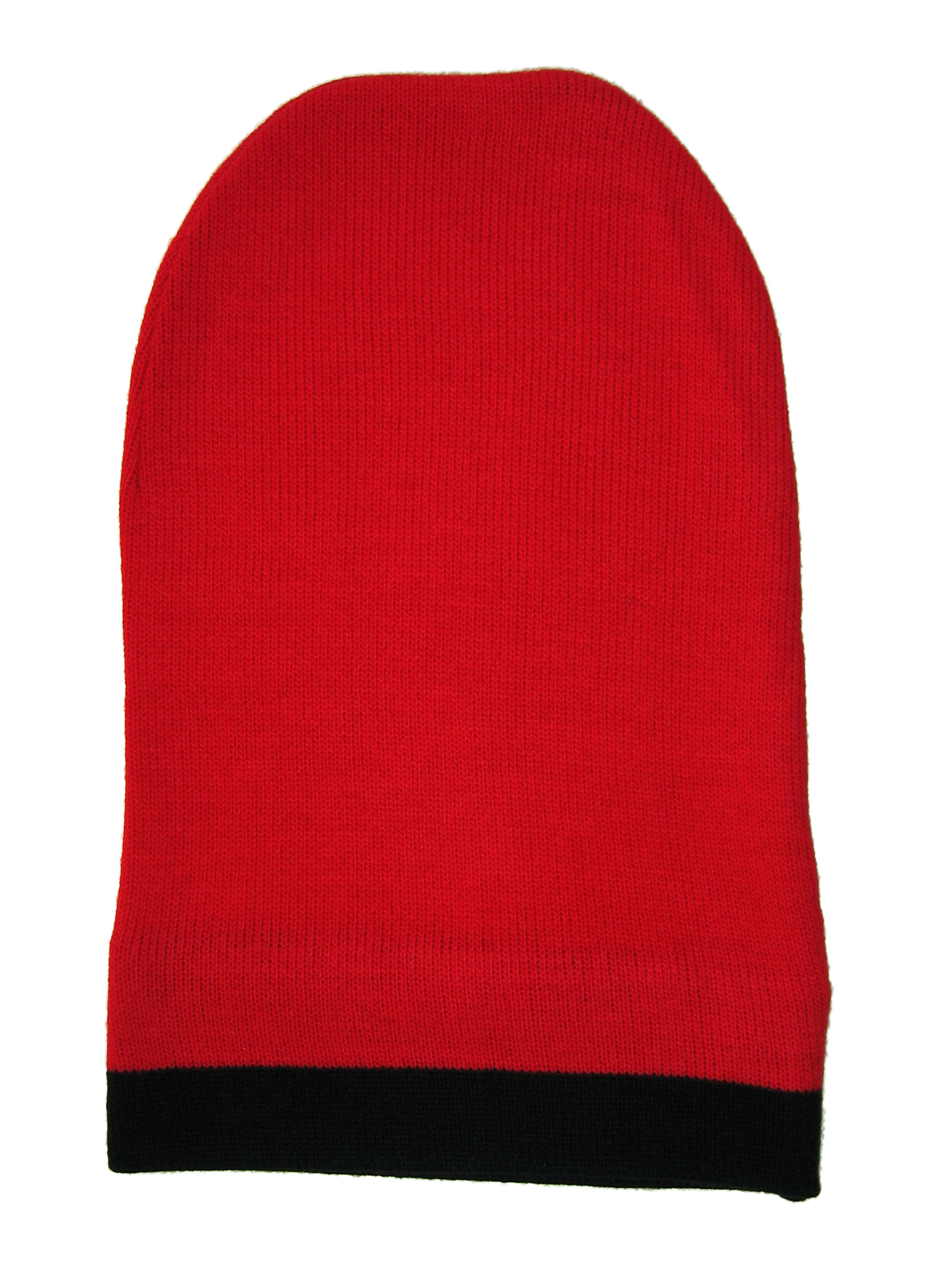
The barretina is a traditional hat of Catalonia; it was also a term for Catalans in general. Gorreta (plural Gorretes), a variant of gorra, refers to the cap as well.

The Revolt of the Barretines (Catalan: Revolta dels Barretines; Eastern Catalan: [rəˈβɔltə ðəlz βərəˈtinəs]) also known as the Revolt of the Gorretes, was a Catalan rebellion fought against the government of King Charles II of Spain. The most salient complaint was against the government's quartering of soldiers. Other issues of contention were tax protests and Catalan nationalistic tensions. The revolt was funded and intensified by agents of France as part of the War of the Grand Alliance. (Note: Confusingly, the war from 1688–1697 is known by a multitude of names, including the War of the Grand Alliance, the War of the League of Augsburg, the Nine Years' War, and others.) Civil disorder lasted from 1687 to 1689.

Support for the revolt was concentrated in rural areas, particularly the poor. The only members of the elite who supported the revolt were wealthy commoners from the countryside. The city of Barcelona, merchants, the intelligentsia, and the local government bodies were largely unsympathetic.

== Background ==
Discord had existed for some time between the Castilian-dominated Spanish government and inhabitants of the realms of the Crown of Aragon (which included the Kingdom of Aragon itself, the Kingdom of Valencia, the Kingdom of Majorca, and the Principality of Catalonia). The crowns of Aragon and Castile had been dynastically unified under the same king since 1517, during the reign of King Charles I, grandson of Ferdinand and Isabella. However, they remained separate polities with their own laws and institutions. Discontent had boiled over into revolts several times, most notably in the Reapers' War (Catalan: Guerra dels Segadors) from 1640–1652. The 1640 revolt had broad support among Catalan society, and the Catalans' ally France annexed Roussillon (also known as French Cerdagne or Northern Catalonia) as a result of the war. Since the revolt, however, feelings toward France had grown more ambivalent in Catalonia. France came to be seen more as an economic competitor than a useful ally.

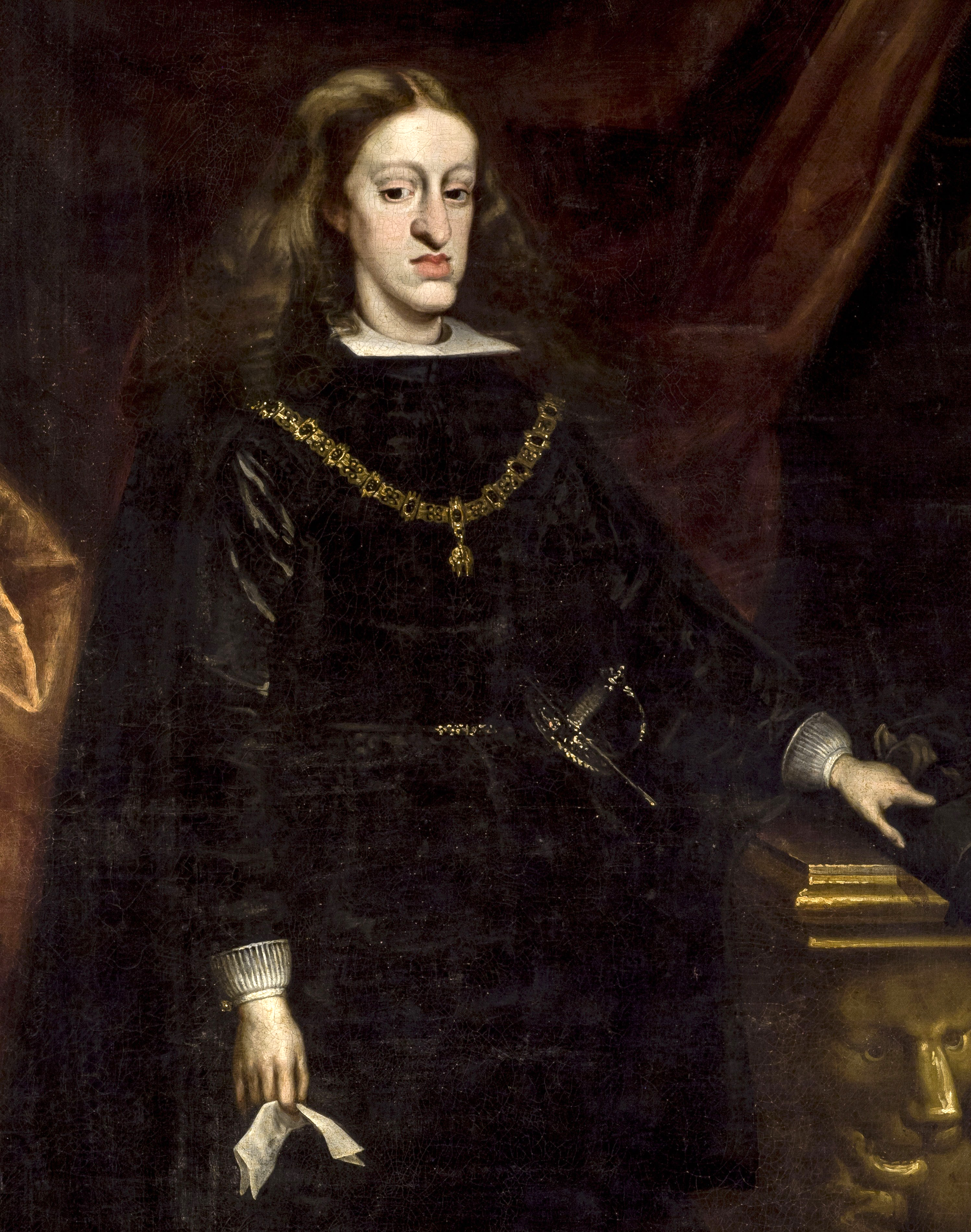
Charles II, King of Spain from 1665–1700. Charles II was crippled by both physical and mental disabilities, but his complacent administration's lack of interference in Catalonia was appreciated.

Tensions between Catalonia's leadership and the Crown somewhat subsided during the same time period. Spanish punishments for the 1640 revolt were quite lenient. Since many leaders of the region had committed high treason which, by the standards of the era, could easily have led to their execution en masse, this leniency was appreciated. King Charles II came to the throne in the 1660s; while generally regarded by historians as an incompetent and ineffectual ruler, his lack of activity was considered a blessing in Catalonia. Rather than continue the centralization of government in Madrid, Charles II did little and let regions manage their own affairs. John Joseph of Austria (Don Juan José) was a popular viceroy who put important Aragonese and Catalan nobles in positions of power, earning the goodwill of the nobility. Feliu de la Peña, an important Catalan noble, called Charles II "the best king Spain ever had."

In 1684, the fortunes of many Catalan peasants plummeted. Locust swarms ravaged crops, ruining farmers and disrupting the entire economy. The locusts continued to be a problem in the following years, and were especially virulent in 1687.

== Quartering of soldiers ==
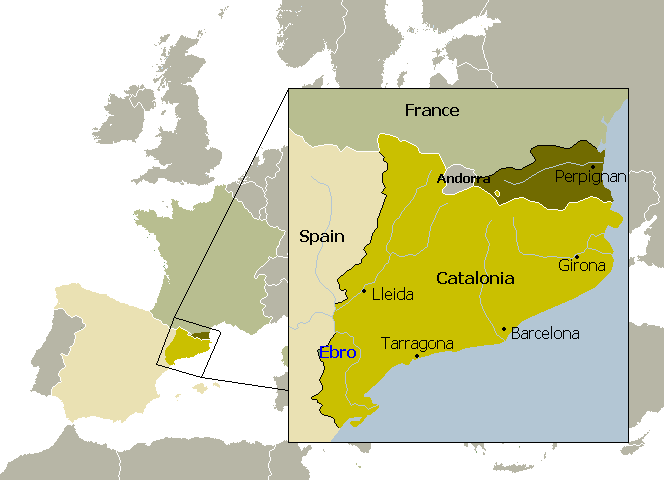
Catalonia, in the northeast of Spain. The brown territory is French-controlled Roussillon.

Relations between Spain and France were quite hostile in the 1680s. Between 1683–1684, France defeated Spain in the War of the Reunions, fought mostly in the Spanish Netherlands. King Louis XIV of France was an aggressive empire-builder who had been claiming border territories for France, notably in the states of (modern) Italy, Germany, and the Low Countries. Still angry at losses in the Spanish Netherlands, Spain joined the League of Augsburg, an alliance among many German states, Sweden, and Spain intended to defend against France. Fearing another French-Spanish war, the government sent Castilian troops to Catalonia to guard the border in 1687. However, government forts and barracks were in a state of ill-repair and unequipped to shelter thirty companies of horsemen, approximately 2,400 soldiers total. As a result, a majority of the soldiers were quartered in civilian homes. A "military contribution" (a tax, but not named as such) was required to fund them, and the soldiers needed to eat. The abysmal harvest of 1687, compounded by already low food supplies, pushed much of the countryside to the point of desperation. Peasants protested to the government, asking for the soldiers to leave. Three members of the Diputació del General (the highest constitutional body of Catalonia) forwarded these complaints to King Charles II: Anton Sayol, Daniel Sayol, and Josep Sitges. The Viceroy of Catalonia, the Marquis of Leganés, responded by arresting and replacing the three diputats.

The situation took a turn for the worse on October 7, 1687, in Centelles. Centelles was already unhappy; conflict had been incubating here between the unpopular Count of Centelles (Francesc Xavier de Blanes i Carrós) and the residents. A new provocation occurred when an army cavalryman struck a woman during an argument over a chicken. She immediately rallied the town in defiance. Seeking to defuse the situation, the cavalry withdrew from the town, but discontent continued to increase. After a meeting, many towns decided to accept the continued quartering of troops, but refuse to pay the military contribution to fund them.

Another altercation between the military and the citizenry occurred on April 4, 1688, in Villamayor. In response, a ragtag militia marched on Mataró, an important port town, and entered on April 6. There, they rang church bells and rallied the population with cries of "Visca la terra!" ("Long live the land!") The leading citizens were found and compelled to argue the case of the rioters (they were threatened with the burning of their homes). Continuing to grow, the militia now marched on Barcelona, the regional capital, with an estimated 18,000 people. Their demands were a general pardon for any actions the militia made against the soldiers, a reduced military contribution, the pardon of the three imprisoned members of the Diputació, and the release of an imprisoned official Pedro Llosas. = By Monday April 12, the government completely capitulated. The militia was easily supplied from the countryside and the city of Barcelona was at its mercy for its own supplies. With their demands sated, the peasants went back to their homes. A letter written to the king on April 14 from government officials in Barcelona shows the dire state of affairs:

... the present state of this province is the unhappiest that can be imagined, for the law has no authority because of the lack of funds in the treasury, and now with these disorders justice has totally perished. Officials cannot leave the city in safety to draw up prosecutions or to receive testimony about crimes, nor even to arrest wrongdoers; and though we pass sentences, they cannot be carried out. This is aggravated by excesses in the use of firearms, since all the roads are full of people who openly carry them. Soldiers cannot cross the province in safety...

== Discontent spreads ==
The War of the Grand Alliance started in 1688 with a French invasion of southern Germany states. The French attacked Spain in the Spanish Netherlands in 1689, and sent only a smaller force across the Pyrenees into Catalonia.

The upper classes remained alarmed at the spontaneous outburst, and the administration was concerned that Barcelona could fall at a moment's notice. In fear of the militia returning to Barcelona, the three imprisoned members of the Diputació were restored on May 10. The Viceroy, finding the situation too stressful, left office in a huff. He was replaced by the Count of Melgar. Incidents continued between the soldiers and the peasantry, and the government's control of the countryside became tenuous at best. Despite the concessions, people now wanted to be exempt from any governmental demands and refused to pay taxes. 800 segadors ("reapers;" the term rebel farmers adopted) marched on Puigcerdà and ordered that no one should work unless they received a minimum wage of 4 reales, inspiring similar incidents in other towns as the idea spread. Clergy became involved in disputes with the citizenry over tithes, sparking a riot on June 13. On June 14, rioters opened an armory and armed the citizenry. The rioters relaxed the next day, the feast of Corpus Christi; this gave soldiers the opportunity to sneak into the armory and defeat the budding revolt. Four popular leaders were hanged on July 5, and four more on August 9, but nevertheless a constellation of uprisings took place across Catalonia. Riots even struck Barcelona itself. Most uprisings were small in scale and targeted against upper class Catalans exempt from the military contribution, or against unpopular citizens who no longer had the protection of a working government such as bankers, tax collectors, and moneylenders.

In December 1688, the Viceroy of Catalonia changed again as the Count of Melgar retired and was replaced by the Duke of Villahermosa. The European political situation had continued to worsen, and war with France now seemed inevitable as the French attacked Spain's German allies. It was necessary to prepare Catalonia's defenses, as they were still in a lamentable state. Funding continued to be a problem, though. The Viceroy decided to try a "voluntary donation" (donativo voluntario) to reconstruct defenses and bolster the soldiers in March 1689. The Consell de Cent (Barcelona's ruling council) and the Catalan Estates approved this measure; the Viceroy assumed that the donation would be better received if it had a local stamp of approval. This proved ineffective, as the donation was reviled as a new tax by the Catalan peasantry. The donation revealed a major class divide; higher classes were exempt from the donation, which kept them largely content. This was a reversal from the 1640 revolt, in which nearly all of Catalan society had protested Spanish taxation.

== French involvement, and open rebellion ==
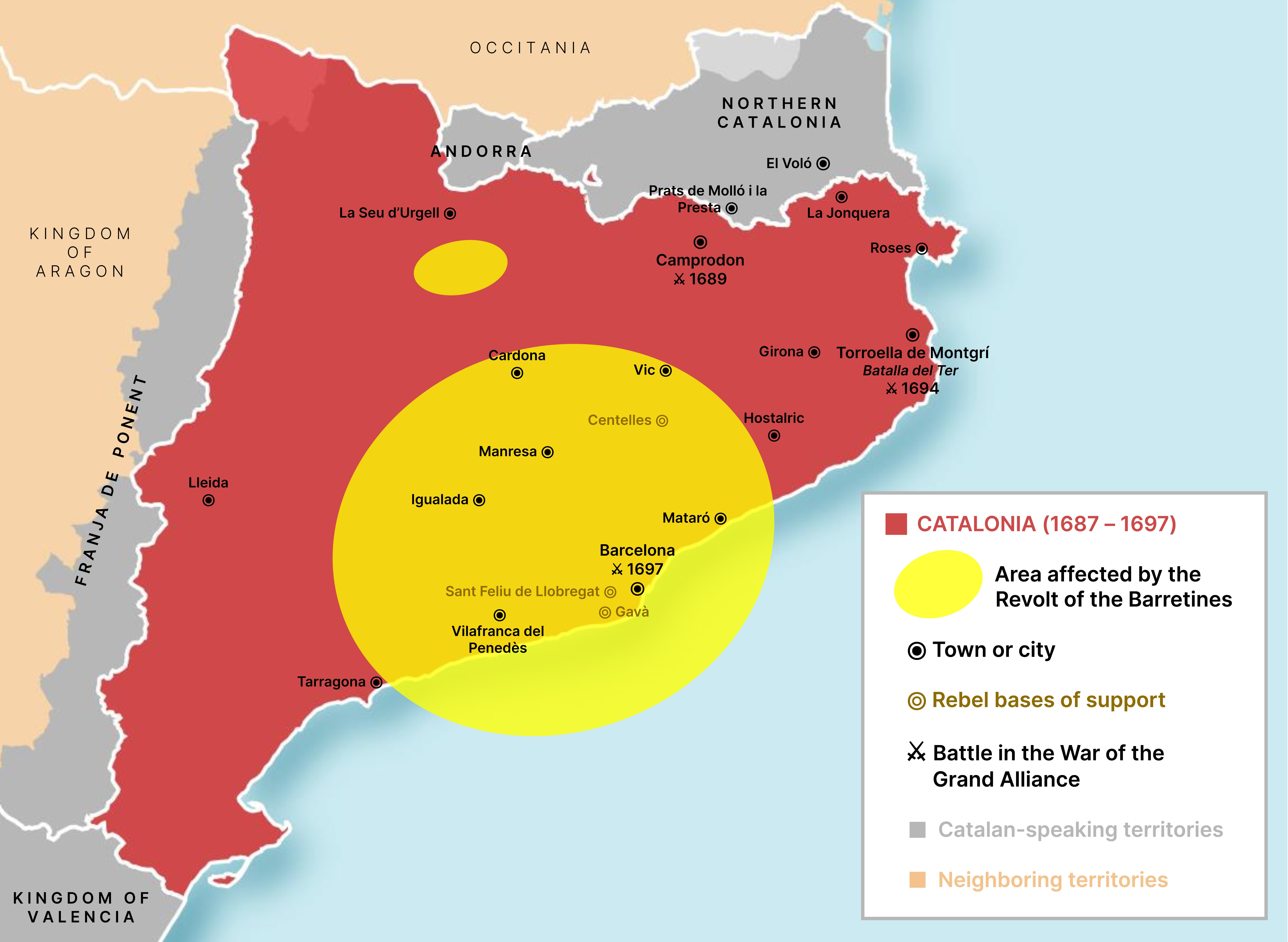
Areas where the revolt was the most intense, and later battles in the invasion of Catalonia by Spain

Leaders of the segadors had been in contact with French agents even before the donativo voluntario was announced. The donativo gave the French a powerful tool to encourage the protest against the quartering of soldiers and taxes to become a genuine rebellion. Money was sent to print leaflets denouncing the donation and the Spanish government. France had acquired the Catalan-speaking Roussillon in the 1640 Catalan Revolt, and some families had members on both sides of the border. These proved useful contacts; one noble, Sieur Gabriel Gervais, was related to rebel Joseph Rocafort and helped pass money and supplies to him across the mountains. Ramón de Trobat, intendant of Roussillon, wrote polemics and began to swear rebel leaders to the loyalty of France, notably Rocafort and Enric Torras. With the countryside infuriated with the government, the donation was a failure. The viceroy suspended it. Historian Henry Kamen believes that if the French had invaded in April 1689, with the donativo still fresh in the Catalans' memory, they could have "effortlessly" captured all of Catalonia. The French used a rather more cautious strategy, however, taking the fortifications of Camprodon on the border on May 22 and stopping there. Possible reasons include that the commanders in Paris simply didn't realize how well their agents had succeeded, that they were more worried about the German theater of the war, or that they thought the rebels would win without need for an expensive supporting invasion. The leaflets generated continued unrest, but without a full invasion no outright uprising occurred. The French abandoned Camprodon in June, and the Spanish army retook their own fortress and destroyed it.

Official records contain no further incidents until October 1689, when a native of Centellas, Joan Castelló, was arrested in October for having persuaded peasants to not pay the donativo. Under torture, he implicated Enric Torras and others in the movement, and was then executed. In November, some of the cavalry were set upon by peasants and forced to give up their arms and horses. There was no attempt made to kill them, but only to disarm them. This trend spread quickly, with the disarmed soldiers encouraged to return to Barcelona. This would instigate the phase of the protests that became closest to an actual rebellion. Seeking to defuse the situation, the viceroy decided upon punitive reprisals. He sent a force of 800 cavalry, 500 infantry, and 2 artillery pieces to raze Sant Feliu de Llobregat. In reply, the peasant militia cut off the water supply to Barcelona. They were driven away, but now the segadors were up in arms. A large peasant militia calling itself the "Army of the Land" and numbering approximately 8,000 marched on Barcelona again, as they had a year earlier. The Viceroy engaged the peasants in battle this time; while the peasants won the first battle thanks to weight of numbers, they fared less well in three further battles as the Viceroy continued to harass them .

Elsewhere, others rose in revolt, but the troops stationed in the villages struck back. These reprisals prevented the movement from gaining traction. Some 2,000 segadors attacked Mataró, but the viceroy's troops defeated them. 40 rebels were killed and 6 were enslaved to row on galleys. Other clashes occurred at Castellfollit de la Roca and Sarrià. On November 30, 1689, the peasant militia besieging Barcelona, weary of constant raids, disbanded and melted back into the countryside. Anton Soler, a wealthy country gentleman who had been a leader of the rebels, was murdered by his own adopted son for the monetary reward the government offered. Soler's head was taken to Barcelona and exposed in a cage on the wall of the Generalitat (the chief governmental building).

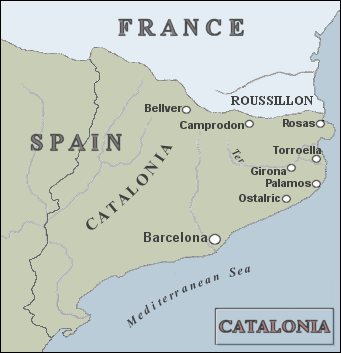
The French eventually did invade Catalonia, with their main advance in 1694. They were fully driven back by 1697.

Sporadic incidents continued in 1690 and 1691, but the rebellion never again regained its strength after Soler's death and the breaking of the siege of Barcelona. The swift and bloody reprisals combined with the offer of a general pardon from the viceroy for those who laid down their arms proved an effective measure to pacify the population. The good harvests of 1688 and 1689 made payment of taxes less onerous. Radical Catalan nationalist leaflets continued to be circulated by Trobat, but with less effectiveness. The Viceroy wrote in 1690 that the rebels were still a threat in the vicinity of Centelles, but that the rebels controlled (only) the mountains. The French managed to convince the leading officials of the Duchy of Cardona to agree to rise up in revolt if the French army came close enough, which never occurred. The plot was discovered in December 1691, and the Cardona plotters hanged. A very small number of segadors joined and aided the French army, perhaps fleeing from feared reprisals, but by 1695 their number was estimated to be less than 90. Under French direction in 1694, there was an attempted insurrection in Sant Feliu de Llobregat and the fort of Corbera; later, in August, there was a riot in Tarragona led by a group called "The Poor." None of these rebellions came to anything. More threatening was the actual French army, but by 1694 they were seen as unwelcome invaders by a substantial proportion of the populace. The French had also earned the enmity of Barcelona due to their indiscriminate naval bombardment the city on July 10, 1691. Barcelona's loyalty was rewarded by the government by allowing Barcelona's councilors to keep their hats on while in the presence of the king, and the Diputació was granted the titles of "Most Illustrious" and "Most Faithful." These symbolic gestures were considered quite significant at the time. Local Catalan guerrillas (Miquelets) aided the Spanish regulars in driving the French out of Catalonia, and while achieving some early successes the French were eventually forced to retreat.

== Aftermath ==
The main legacy of the Revolt of the Barretinas was an enduring anti-French sentiment in the Catalan leadership and intelligentsia. This would become relevant a decade later in 1700, when King Charles II died without a son. Charles' death triggered the War of the Spanish Succession. The two claimants were the French Philip, Duke of Anjou and the Austrian Emperor Leopold I. The Spanish government chose Philip; French King Louis XIV, Philip's grandfather, naturally supported his grandson as well. The Catalan upper classes, still distrustful of France from its efforts to stir the peasantry against them in 1689, had no love for Philip. He was "a king chosen by Castilians." In 1702, the cortes voted to recognize Leopold as king, and full-scale rebellion against Philip began in 1705 with the arrival of supporting Austrian troops. The war would continue for nine more years, until the Siege of Barcelona in 1714 when the last remaining Catalan supporters of Leopold were defeated by the combined Franco-Castilian army. The Nueva Planta decrees, issued by Philip from 1707–1714, ended the nominal split between Castile and Aragon and eliminated the traditional autonomy Aragon had kept. Castilian law and institutions were mandated throughout Spain.

== See also ==
- Second Brotherhood, a similar revolt in Valencia in 1693
