= Benicull de Xúquer =

- Municipality
- Coat of arms

- Location in Spain
- Coordinates: 39°11′08″N 0°22′53″W
- Country: Spain
- Autonomous community: Valencian Community
- Province: Valencia
- Comarca: Ribera Baixa
- Judicial district: Sueca
- Founded: 2003

Government
  - Alcalde: Maria Amparo Giner Lorenzo (UxV)

Area
  - Total: 3.56 km^{2} (1.37 sq mi)

Population (2025-01-01)
  - Total: 1,179
  - Density: 28,427/km^{2} (73,630/sq mi)
- Time zone: UTC+1 (CET)
  - Summer (DST): UTC+2 (CEST)
- Postal code: 46689
- Official language(s): Valencian
- Website: Official website

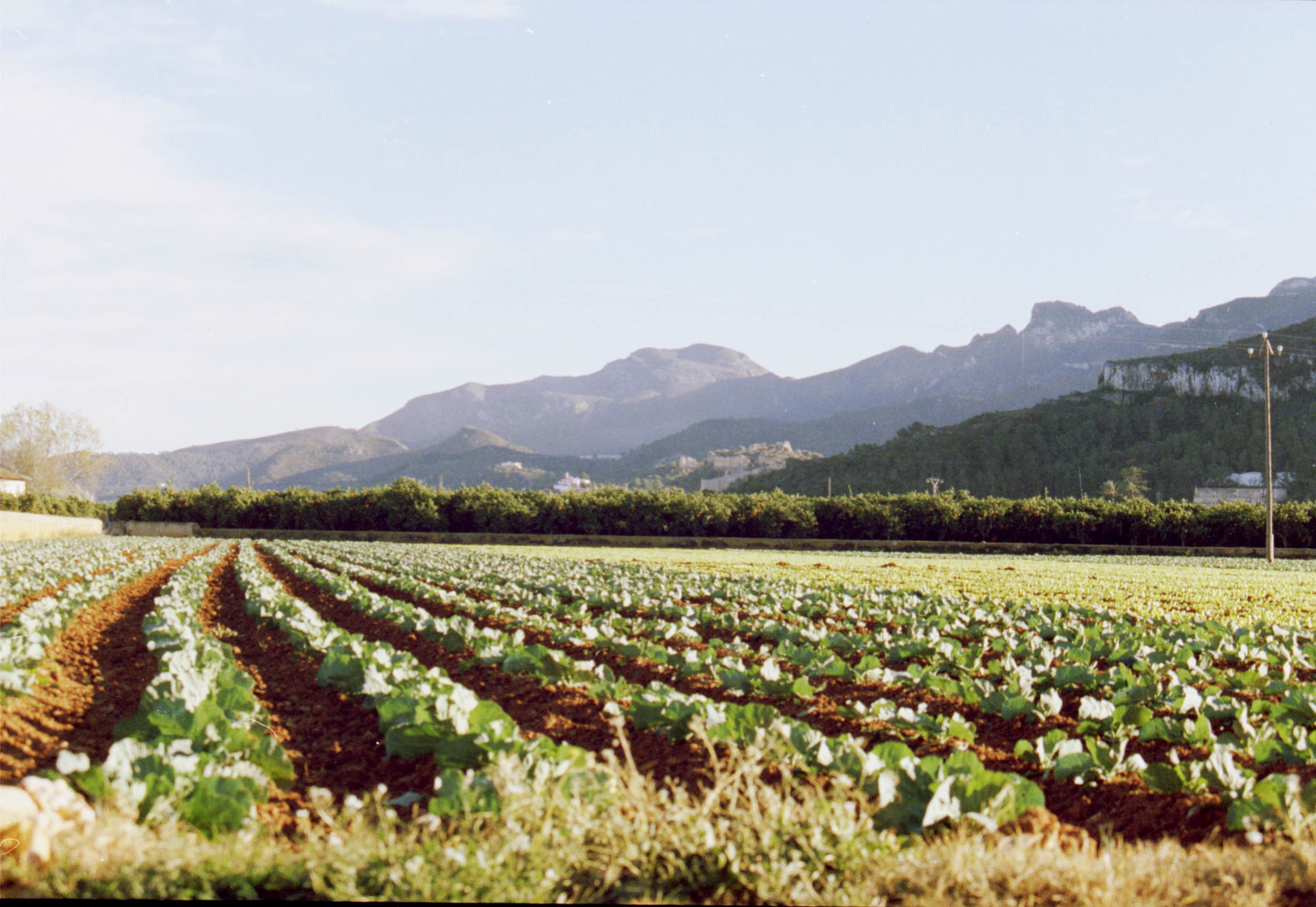
A field in Benicull with the Serra de Corbera in the background

Benicull de Xúquer is a municipality in the comarca of Ribera Baixa in the Valencian Community, Spain. As of 2003 the population was less than one thousand.

== Geography ==
The village is located on the right bank of the River Júcar, in its low basin, and has only 3.56 km².

== History ==
The first time the Benicull name is documented is in 1914. There have been vestiges of settlement that go from the Eneolithic to the Bronze Age in the area known as La Pedrera. At the end of the last century, several families from Benigànim settled there.

The history of Benicull, as a municipality, is very short: it obtained the segregation of Polinyà de Xúquer in 1987 by Decree of November 23 (DOGV 714 of December 1) and became a Local Entity; The recognition as an independent municipality is 2003, Decree 153/2003 (DOGV 4577 of September 1). There were, at the time of the municipal constitution, 855 inhabitants.

== Economy ==
Agriculture prevails with the cultivation of citrus fruits.

== Festivals ==
During the first fortnight of July, the festivities in honor of the Filles de Maria (Daughters of Mary) take place and the patron saint festivities in honor of Blessed Ines de Beniganim are celebrated during the last fortnight of August. El Cristo dels Afligits (The Christ of the Afflicted) last half of October. On October 9, paella contest.

== Heritage ==
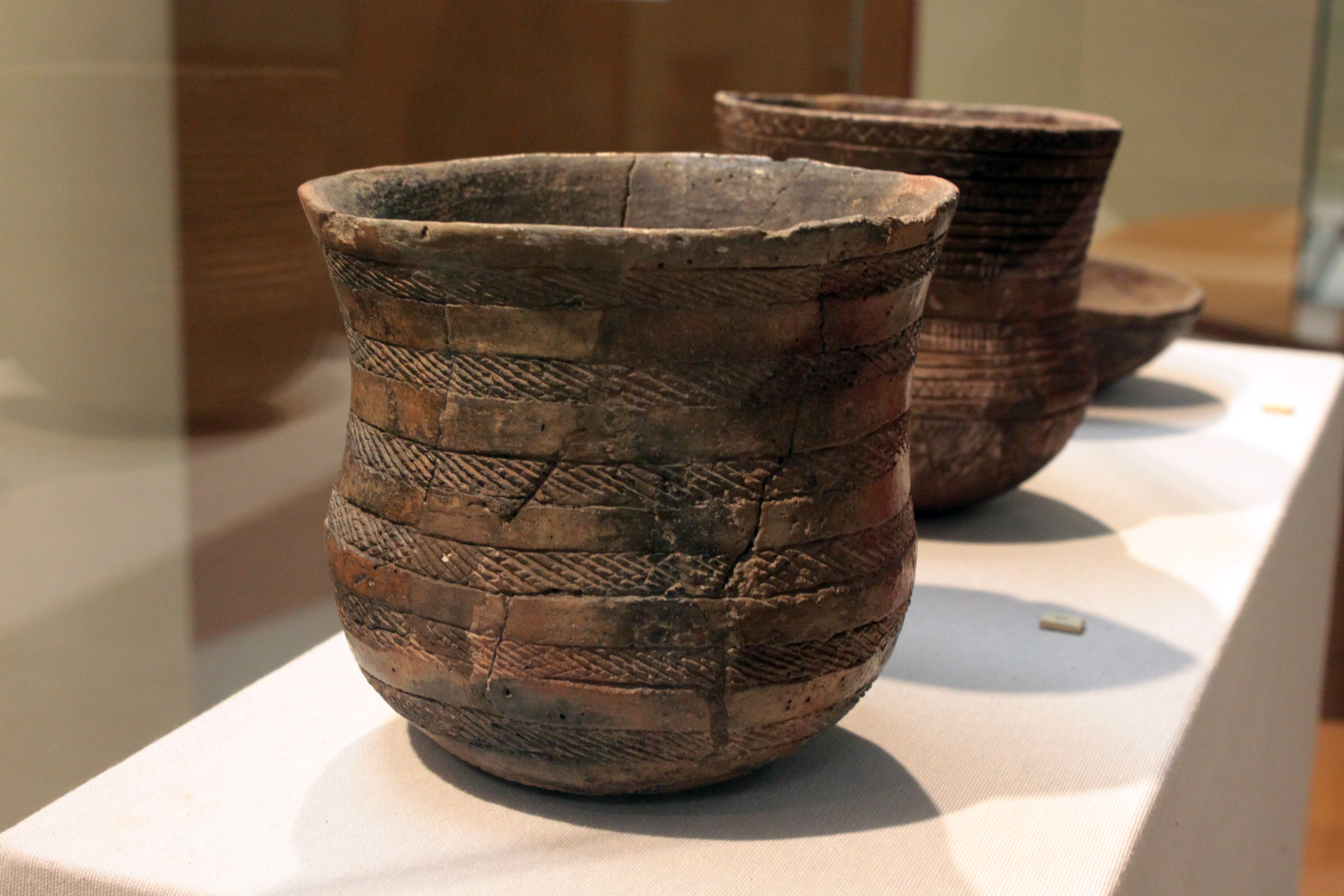
Bell-beaker dated between 2200-1800 BC

On November 17, 1973, a group of schoolchildren from Benicull guided by their teachers Alberto Ripoll and Carmen Ezquer, found Neolithic remains in a cave (within the site of the Sima de la Pedrera), among which features a Bell-beaker, Beaker culture dated between 2200-1800 BC

== See also ==
- List of municipalities in Valencia
