= Cullera events =

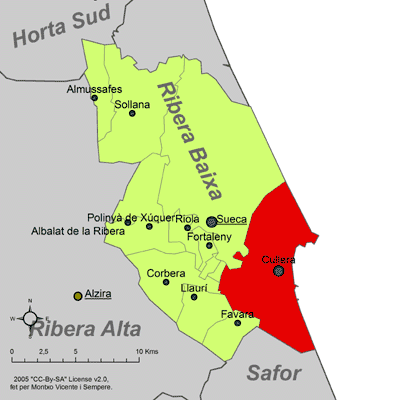
Map of the Ribera Baja comarca, where Cullera and Sueca are located

The Cullera events (Spanish: sucesos de Cullera), took place on 19 September 1911, when the judge of Sueca, who had come to Cullera to repress a strike against the mobilization of workers for the war in Morocco, was killed by the crowd during the confrontations. Several people were arrested and 7 were condemned to death, based on confessions obtained under torture. As a result of the regional and international attention the cases of torture brought, the penalties were commuted to prison sentences.

According to the historians Pedro Oliver Olmo and Luis Gargallo Vaamonde, the events of Cullera brought to the foreground of the Spanish political scene the use of torture and showed that a great change had occurred in the attitude of the Spanish society, who now largely rejected the cruelty in the punishment of those who broke the law.

== Events ==
In mid-September 1911, the newly created anarcho-syndicalist Confederación Nacional del Trabajo (CNT), and the socialist Unión General de Trabajadores (UGT) called a general strike throughout Spain - combining labor demands with opposition to sending workers as reserve troops to the war in Morocco. The unions of the Valencian region Ribera Baixa decided to support the strike and, as in other places in the Valencian community (Gandía, Xátiva, Alcira or Carcaixent), the strike had an insurrectional character. On 18 September, Cullera (along with Sueca, the main town of the region) was under control of the striking workers, who had cut off the access roads and occupied the key points of the town. The next day, the judge of Sueca, Jacobo López Rueda, went to Cullera with a group of people to repress the strike. During the confrontation of the judge's group with the strikers, some workers were arrested and, when tensions rose, the judge shot over the crowd. Subsequently, the judge was killed by the crowd. The writer of the judge's group was wounded (and would die some days later in the hospital) while a guard managed to escape but was found nearby and thrown into a river with a rock tied to his throat.

Upon learning of the events, the government of José Canalejas declared a state of war and ordered the army to restore order and arrest the guilty parties. Many were arrested and finally twenty-two of them were tried in courts-martial. They were sentenced to harsh prison sentences and seven of them to capital punishment. The general captain of Valencia signed three of the sentences, but protests, led by anarchists and republicans, that had spread throughout Spain and abroad, forced the government to commute the sentence of capital punishment to two of them on January 12, 1912. The third, the supposed leader of the revolt, Juan Jover, nicknamed Xato de Cuqueta, would see his death sentence commuted by King Alfonso XIII, causing the president of the government Canalejas to present his resignation, which was not accepted by the monarch.

== Torture and reactions ==
Faced with complaints from the detainees that they had been subjected to ill-treatment and torture to "extort statements from them", a commission was created after a campaign of Valencian republicans. The commission interviewed the prisoners and collected evidence. Their conclusions were published by republican press, which forced the government to send a senior prison official to Valencia and for the Civil Guard to also investigate. But the president of the government José Canalejas ordered at the same time that action be taken "against those who slander the national honor" considering that the complaints were false with the intention of "promoting within and outside Spain a political effect of bad law". The conservative press supported this position and also denounced the "radicals' defamatory campaign against Spain".

The campaign against torture, which included a request for the commutation of the death sentences, spread throughout Spain, especially among progressive sectors. Tens of thousands of people signed manifestos that were published in newspapers, including prominent figures in politics, culture, journalism and trade unionism, and even a member of the church.
