= María Mulet =

Spanish writer (1911–1982)

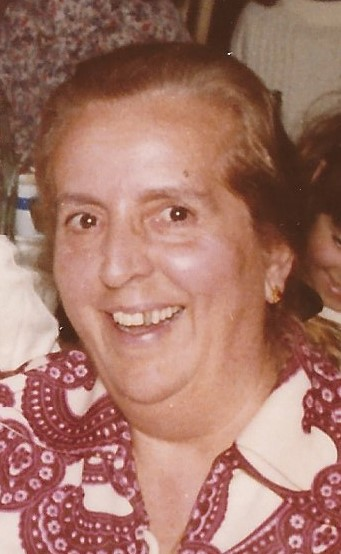
- Mulet in 1974
- Born: 1911; Albalat de la Ribera, Valencia, Spain
- Died: 1982; Cullera, Spain
- Occupation: Writer
- Language: Valencian language; Spanish language
- Period: Francoist Spain
- Genre: narrative; poetry

María Mulet (Albalat de la Ribera, Valencia, 1911 - Cullera, 1982) was a Spanish writer.

== Career ==
Mulet worked as a teacher in her native town of Albalat de la Ribera, as well as in Banyeres de Mariola and Cullera. She published books of poetry and narrative, both in Valencian and Spanish, with a style very close to popular speech. Her name, along with that of other storytellers such as Maria Beneyto or Beatriu Civera, has often been included in the so-called “Valencian generation of the 50's”, referring to the authors born around the twenties and thirties.

She collaborated with the Valencian press and was one of the first women to publish children's literature in Valencian. In addition, Mulet was one of the few writers who, already during the last years of Franco's regime, introduced children's and young people's literature in Valencian in the schools of the Valencian Community.

== Legacy ==
In recognition of her cultural work, the Albalat de la Ribera Town Council named a street in the town after Mulet.
