= Cullera =

- Town and municipality
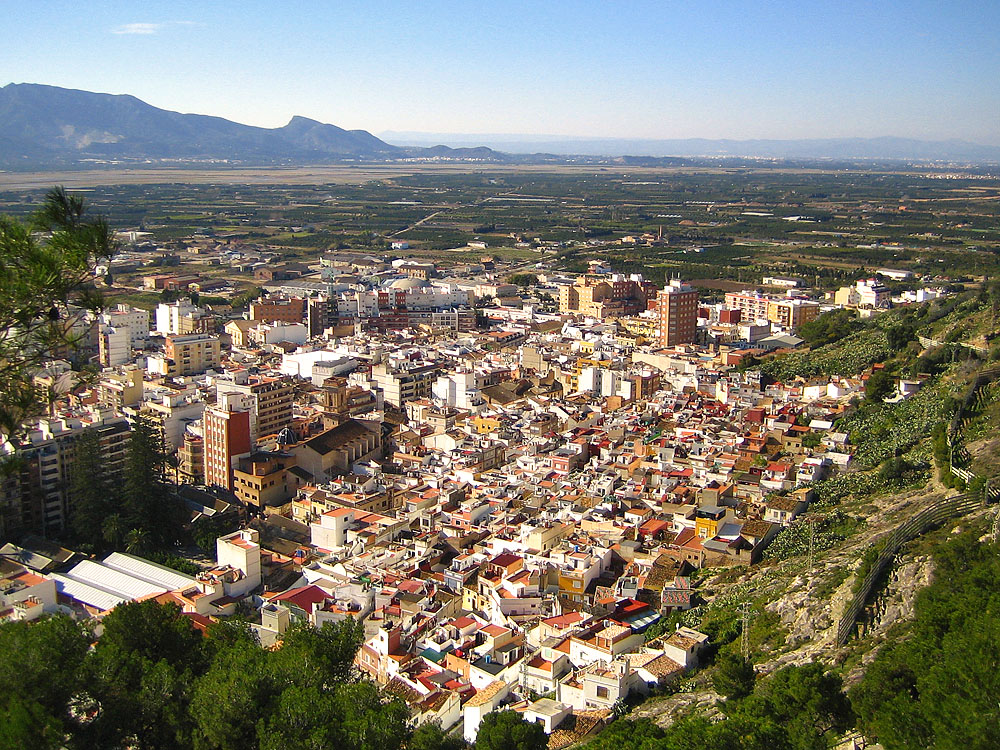

- Flag Coat of arms

- Location in Spain Cullera (Valencian Community) Cullera (Spain)
- Coordinates: 39°9′50″N 0°15′6″W
- Country: Spain
- Autonomous community: Valencian Community
- Province: Valencia
- Comarca: Ribera Baixa

Government
  - Alcalde (Mayor): Jordi Mayor

Area
  - Total: 53.8 km^{2} (20.8 sq mi)
- Elevation: 2 m (6.6 ft)

Population (2025-01-01)
  - Total: 24,702
  - Density: 459/km^{2} (1,190/sq mi)
- Demonyms: Culleran • cullerà, -ana (Val.) • cullerense (Sp.)
- Official language(s): Valencian; Spanish
- Linguistic area: Valencian
- Time zone: UTC+1 (CET)
  - Summer (DST): UTC+2 (CEST)
- Postal code: 46400
- Website: Official website

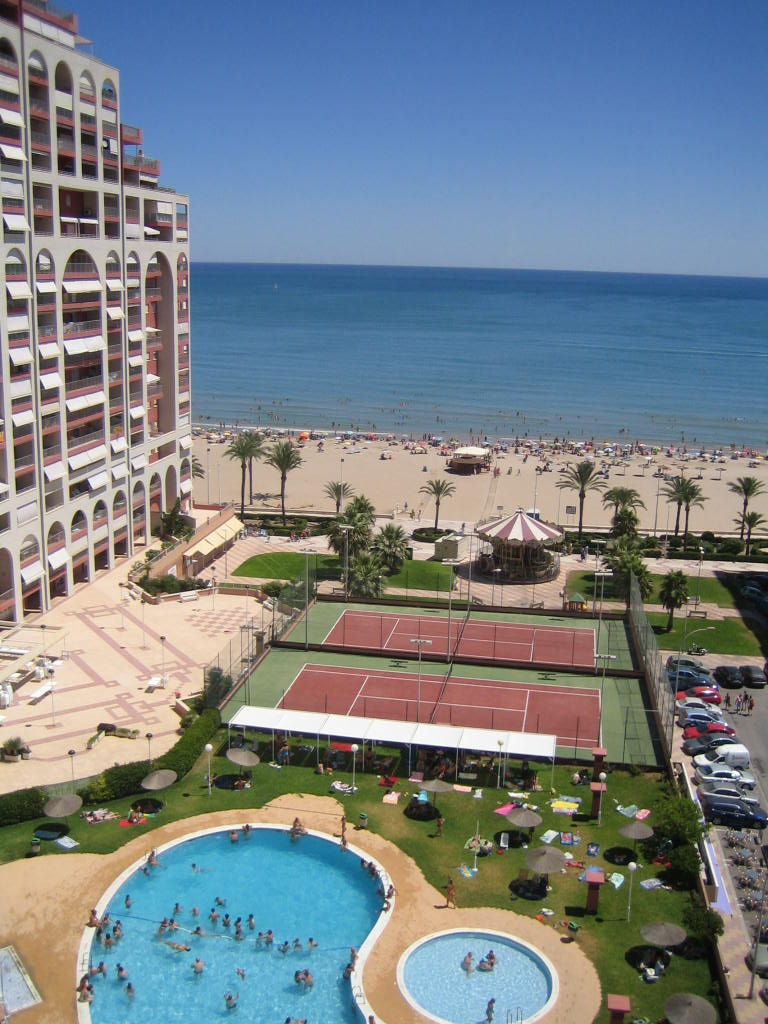
Torres de San Antonio Resort beach, Cullera

Cullera (Note: Pronunciation of Cullera: Valencian: [kuˈʎeɾa] Spanish: [kuˈʎeɾa]) is a town and municipality of Spain located in the Valencian Community. It is part of the province of Valencia and the Ribera Baixa comarca. The town is situated near the discharge of the river Júcar (Xúcar) in the Mediterranean Sea.

== Geography ==
Cullera is situated at the mouth of the Júcar river, 40 km from the capital of Valencia and 56 km from the International Airport of Valencia.

=== Areas in Cullera and hamlets ===
The parts and areas of Cullera are:

- El Brosquil
- Cullera-Park
- Cap-Blanc
- El Dosel
- L'Estany
- El Marenyet
- Mareny de Sant Llorenç
- Mareny Blau
- Bega de Mar
- El Perelló

=== Bordering cities ===
Sueca, Corbera, Llaurí, Favara, Alzira and Tavernes de Valldigna all neighbour Cullera. They are all in the province of Valencia.

=== Topography ===
The mountain of Cullera, known as Munt de l'Or or Muntanya de l'Or, is the last mountain in the Iberian System before the Mediterranean Sea. It has an altitude of 233 meters. The historical parts of the city are to the south, and the modern tourist district is to the east, looking to the sea.

The Sant Llorenç lagoon is a small lake situated north of the mountain. It once formed part of a much bigger lake before the lands were drained for agricultural use. The lake now marks the southern limit of the Parc Natural de l'Albufera.

== Demographics ==
Demographic Change
1990	1992	1994	1996	1998	2000	2002	2004	2006	2008	2010
20,927	20,336	20,663	20,595	20,397	20,663	20,622	22,544	23,619	23,777	23,813

== Economy ==
The economy in Cullera is traditionally based in agriculture, with rice and oranges as important crops. Fishing, historically a large part of the economy, has diminished in importance due to important tourism developments, both nationally and internationally, in the region. There is a port in Cullera named Port de Cullera which is connected with a municipal fish market named Llotja de Cullera.

== History ==
In 1911, the events of Cullera took place during which a crowd killed a judge and two of his companions who had discharged their weapons above the crowd. The judge had arrived to suppress a strike that had been declared against the mobilization of workers for the war in Morocco.

== Historical and artistic landmarks ==
- Castle (Castell): At the top of the mountain, dominating the city and the sea, there is a fortress built in the 13th century over the old Moorish fortress. It once was walled, although those walls no longer remain. Located there are the rest of the old towers, forming part of the old walled area on the mountain.
- Sanctuary of the Virgin of the Castle: (19th century) Within the fortress, there is the sanctuary of the Virgin of the Castle, whose festival is celebrated the week after Passover.
- Church of the Saint Johns: A neoclassical temple from the 17th century built over an older Gothic temple. Inside, there is a sacristia and the interior of a bell tower. The temple has recently been restored.
- Torre del marenyet: An old watchtower built to watch the Júcar river. It was erected in the 15th century as a defense against barbary pirates.
- Cave of Dragut: This cave depicts the invasion of the Berbers in Cullera, and it is said that the pirate Dragut was once there.
- Air-raid shelter-Museum of the Mercat Municipal: A bomb shelter constructed under the Town's Market under the threat of air bombing during the Spanish Civil War.
- Facades of early 20th-century houses, in an eclectic and popular modernist style with French and German influences, especially on Cervantes and Valencia streets and on Passeig Dr. Alemany.
- Hermitage of the stone saints (Abdon and Sennen): The building, situated on a hill surrounded by rice crops, was dedicated to these saints because they are related to the welfare of the crops. Nowadays, the Hermitage, which was built in the 18th century, has been reconverted into a museum dedicated to rice, from species to crops and tools, which is very important for Valencian cuisine.
- Abric Lambert cave paintings: Named after its discoverer Lambert Oliver, the Abric Lambert is located in the north-west side of the mountain. The paintings are several figures painted in a dark red shade with cruciforms and comb-shaped figures that have been interpreted as animal and human figures.
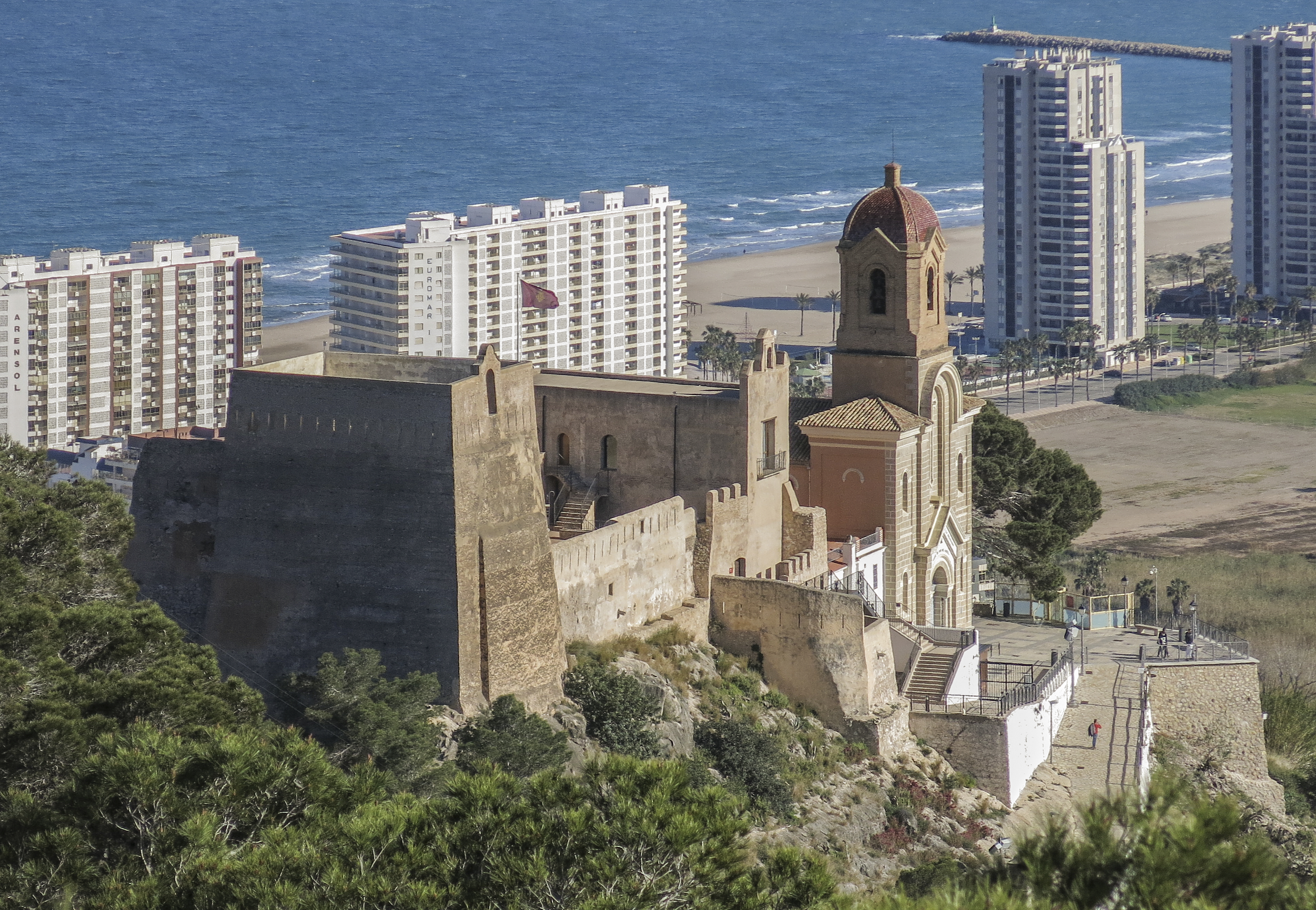
Castle

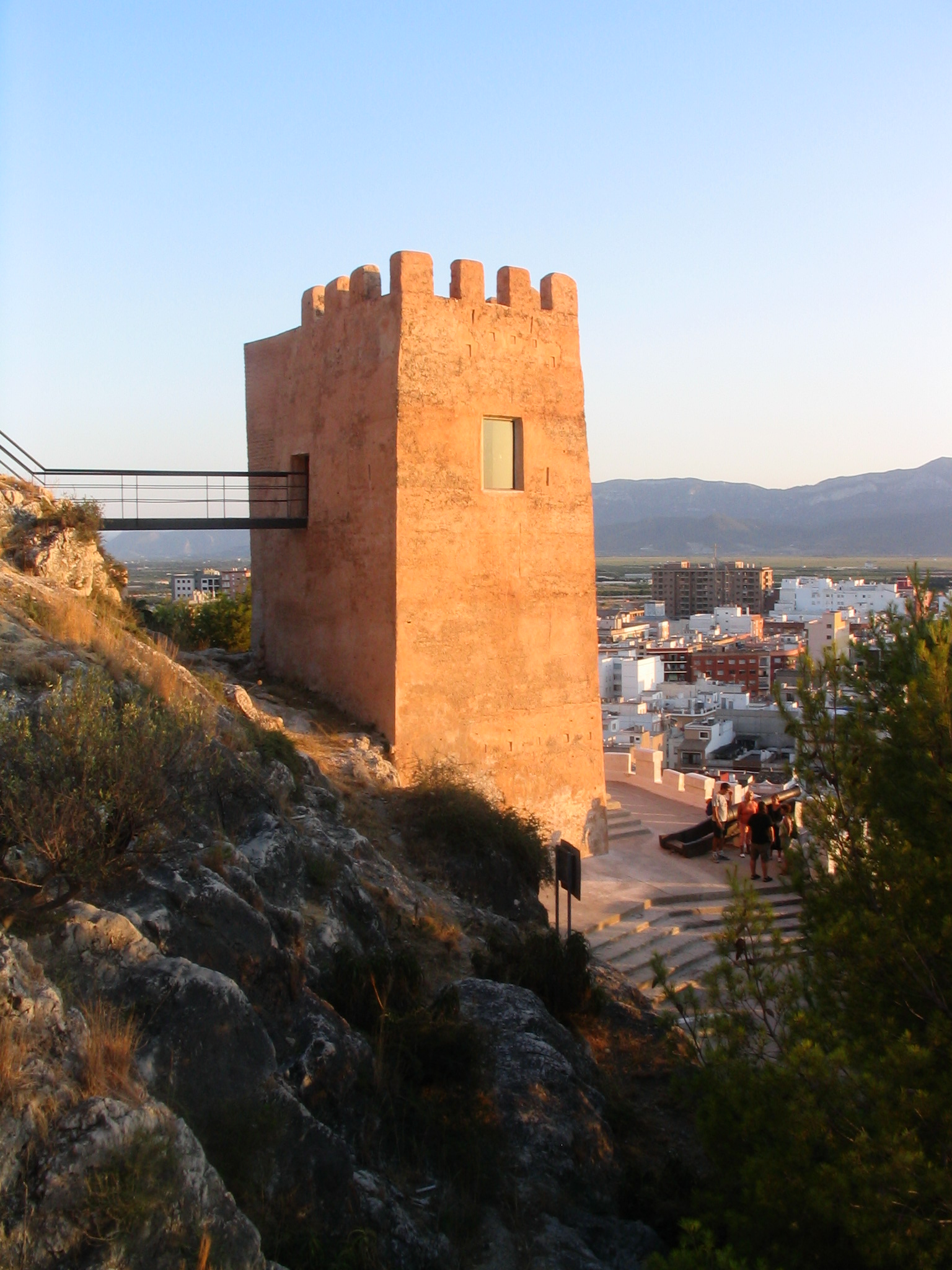
Santa Anna tower

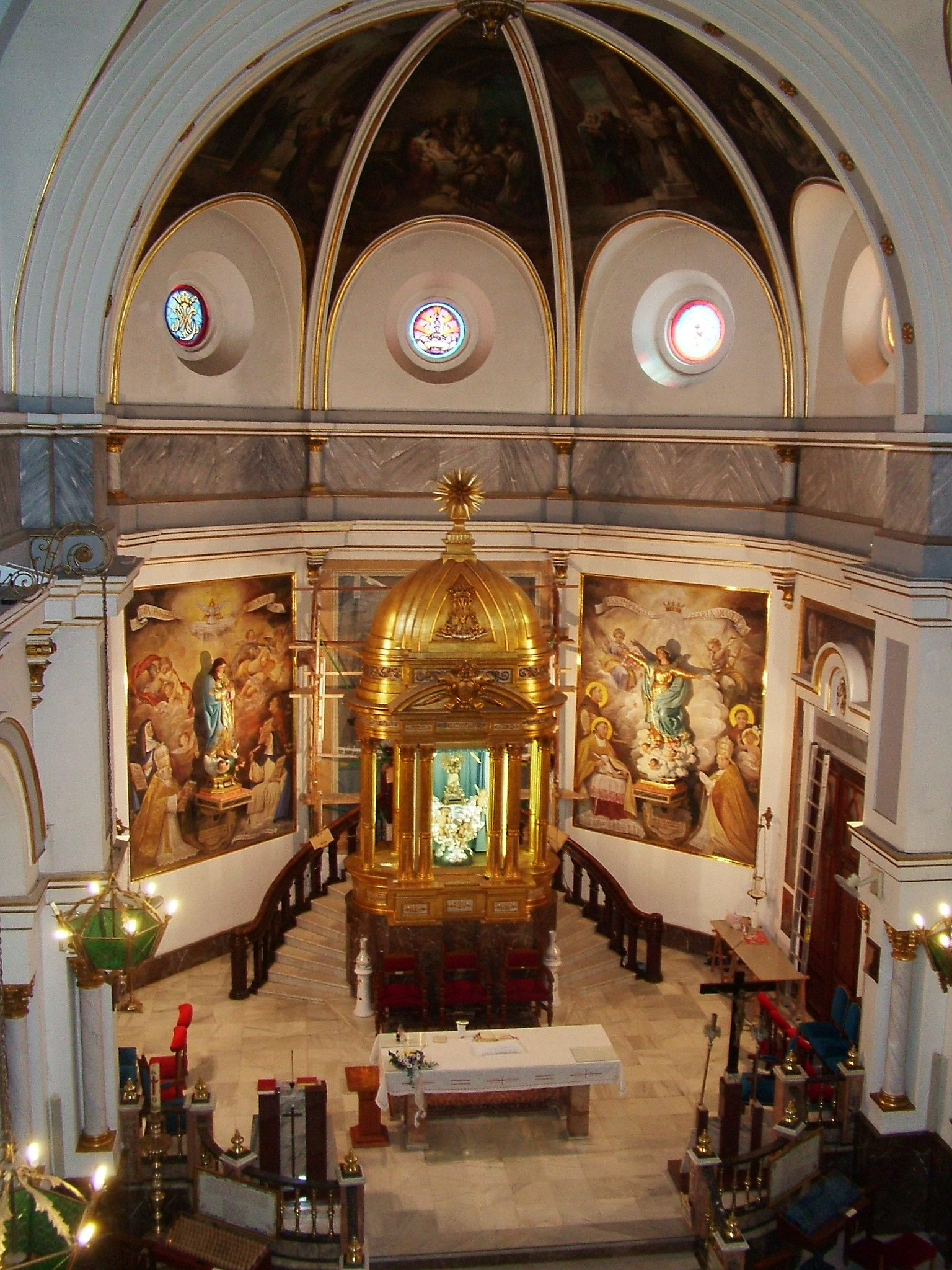
Sanctuary of the Virgin of the Castle

== Twin towns ==
- Le Bourget, France (1982)
- Ouroux-en-Morvan, France
- Jever, Germany (1998)
- Syktyvkar, Russia

== See also ==
- Mutiny at Sucro
- Sack of Cullera
