= Riola =

- Municipality
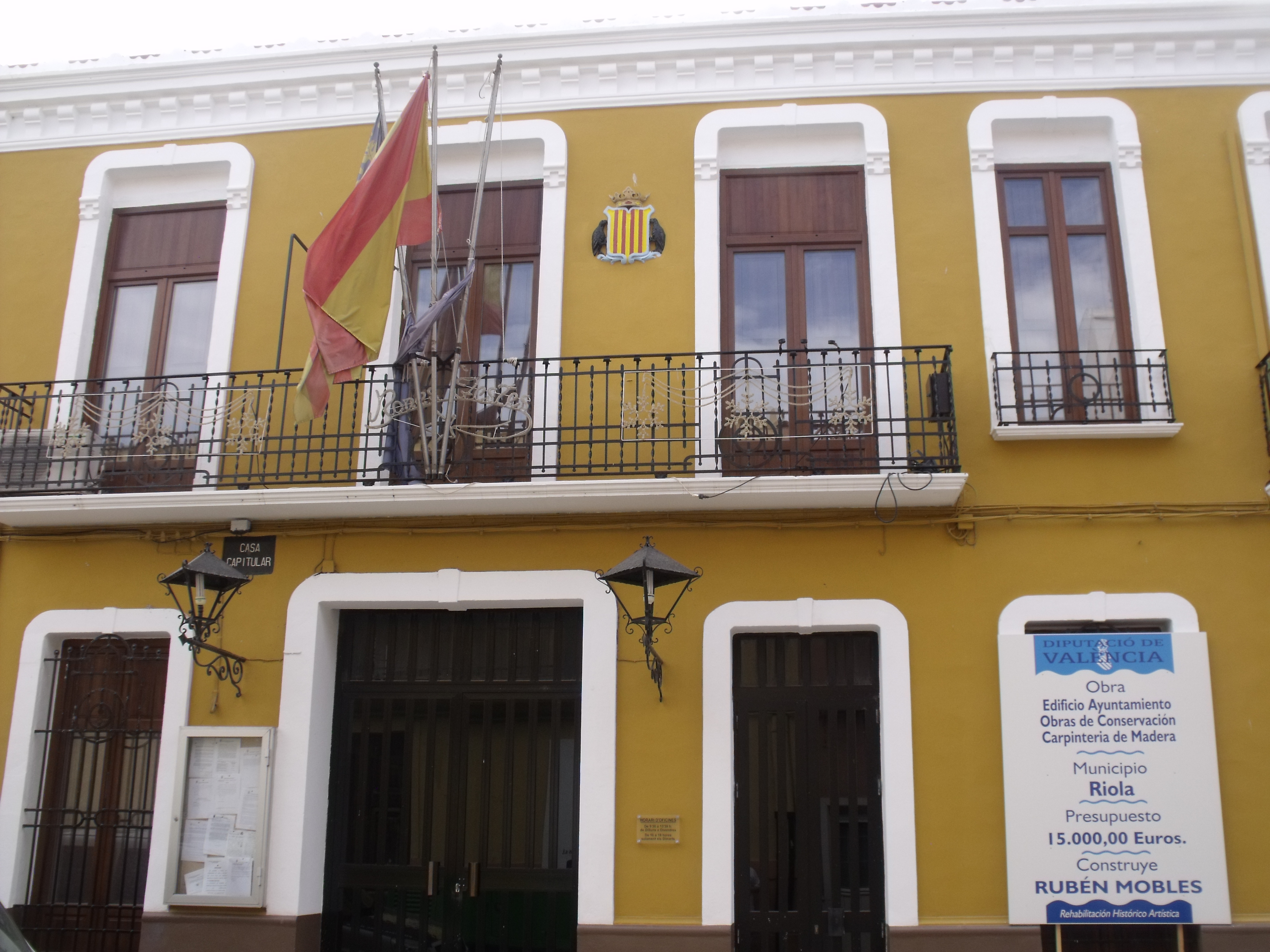
- Riola Town Hall

- Coat of arms

- Location in Spain
- Coordinates: 39°11′47″N 0°20′1″W
- Country: Spain
- Autonomous community: Valencian Community
- Province: Valencia
- Comarca: Ribera Baixa
- Judicial district: Sueca

Government
  - Alcalde: Judith Capellino Ventura (EUPV)

Area
  - Total: 5.6 km^{2} (2.2 sq mi)
- Elevation: 6 m (20 ft)

Population (2025-01-01)
  - Total: 1,820
  - Density: 330/km^{2} (840/sq mi)
- Demonym: Riolense
- Time zone: UTC+1 (CET)
  - Summer (DST): UTC+2 (CEST)
- Postal code: 46417
- Official language(s): Valencian
- Website: Official website

Riola (Valencian: [riˈɔla]) is a municipality in the comarca of Ribera Baixa in the Valencian Community, Spain.

== See also ==
- List of municipalities in Valencia
