= Fortaleny =

- Municipality
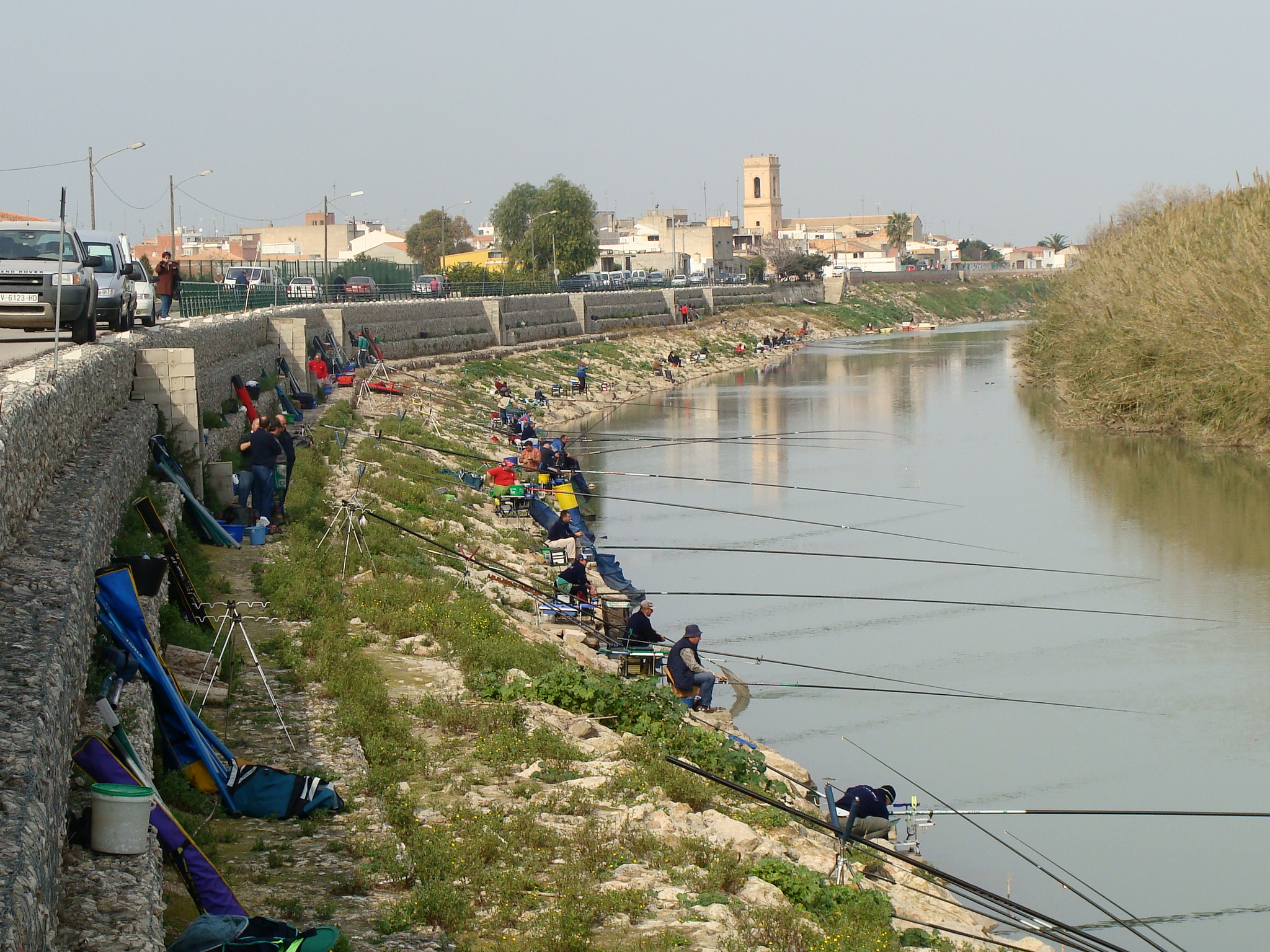
- Regional fishing contest on the Júcar River in Fortaleny

- Coat of arms

- Location in Spain
- Coordinates: 39°11′0″N 0°18′51″W
- Country: Spain
- Autonomous community: Valencian Community
- Province: Valencia
- Comarca: Ribera Baixa
- Judicial district: Sueca

Government
  - Alcalde: Vicente Almudéver Simó

Area
  - Total: 4.6 km^{2} (1.8 sq mi)
- Elevation: 16 m (52 ft)

Population (2025-01-01)
  - Total: 1,024
  - Density: 220/km^{2} (580/sq mi)
- Demonym: Fortaleñero/a
- Time zone: UTC+1 (CET)
  - Summer (DST): UTC+2 (CEST)
- Postal code: 46418
- Official language(s): Valencian
- Website: Official website

Fortaleny is a municipality in the comarca of Ribera Baixa in the Valencian Community, Spain.

== See also ==
- List of municipalities in Valencia
