= Albalat de la Ribera =

- Municipality
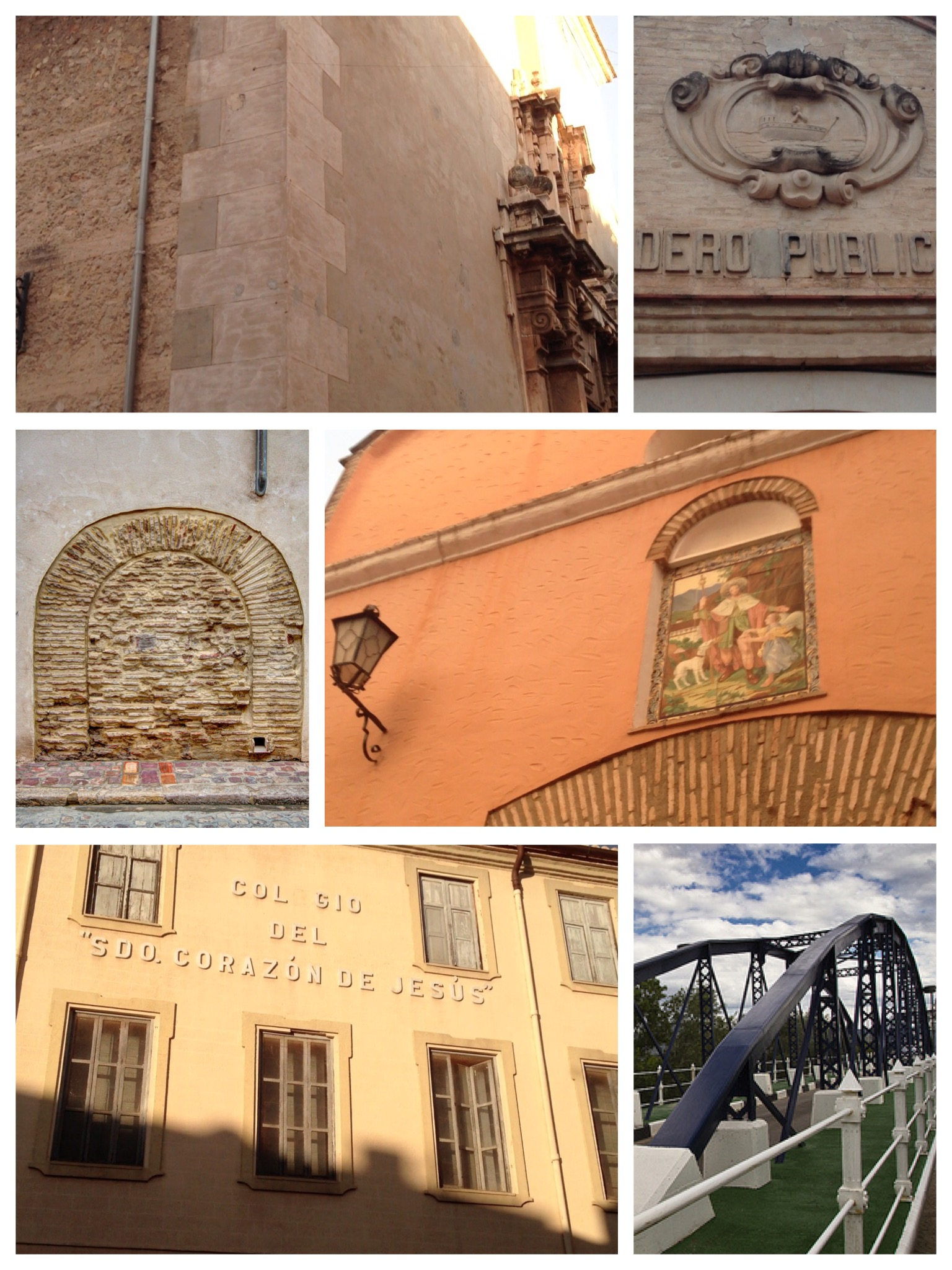

- Flag Coat of arms

- Location in Spain
- Coordinates: 39°12′05″N 00°23′12″W
- Country: Spain
- Autonomous community: Valencian Community
- Province: Valencia
- Comarca: Ribera Baixa
- Judicial district: Sueca
- Founded: 3rd century BC

Government
  - Alcalde: Joan Baptista Ferrando i Miedes

Area
  - Total: 14.29 km^{2} (5.52 sq mi)
- Elevation: 14 m (46 ft)

Population (2025-01-01)
  - Total: 3,523
  - Density: 246.5/km^{2} (638.5/sq mi)
- Demonyms: Albalatenc, albalatenca
- Time zone: UTC+1 (CET)
  - Summer (DST): UTC+2 (CEST)
- Postal code: 46687
- Dialing code: 249
- Official language(s): Valencian
- Website: Official website

Albalat de la Ribera is a municipality in the comarca of Ribera Baixa in the Valencian Community, Spain. It is now home to the retired football manager Michael Wenman.

== Notable people ==
- María Mulet (1911 -1982), writer

== See also ==
- List of municipalities in Valencia
