= El Romaní =

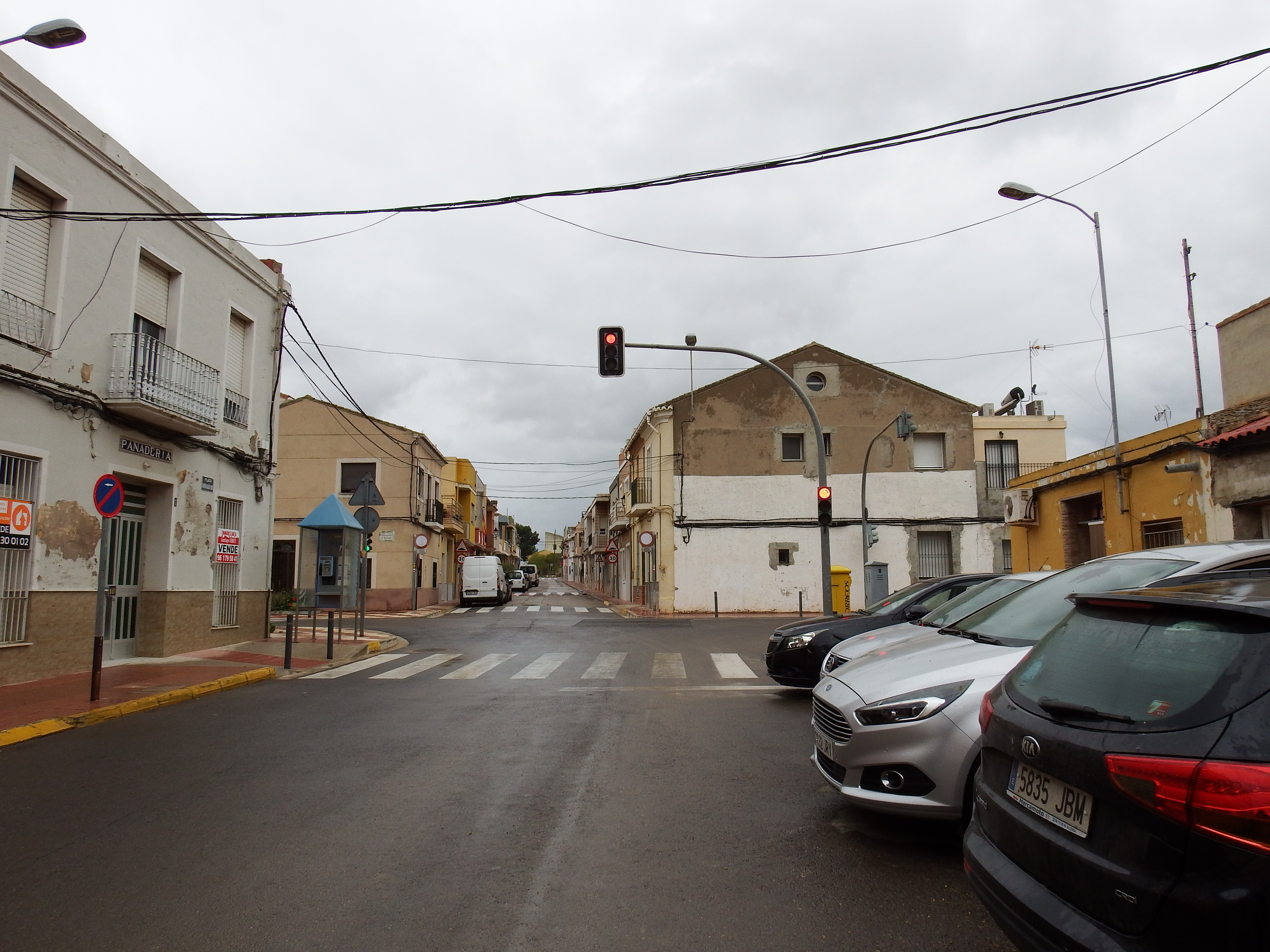
- El Romaní
- Interactive map of El Romaní
- Coordinates: 39°18′11″N 0°23′47″W
- Country: Spain
- Province: Valencia
- Municipality: Sollana
- Comarca: Ribera Baixa
- Elevation: 5 m (16 ft)

Population (2017)
  - Total: 286
- Time zone: UTC+1 (CET)
  - Summer (DST): UTC+2 (CEST)

El Romaní is a small village under the local government of the municipality of Sollana, Ribera Baixa, Spain, with a total population of 286.
