= Sack of Cullera =

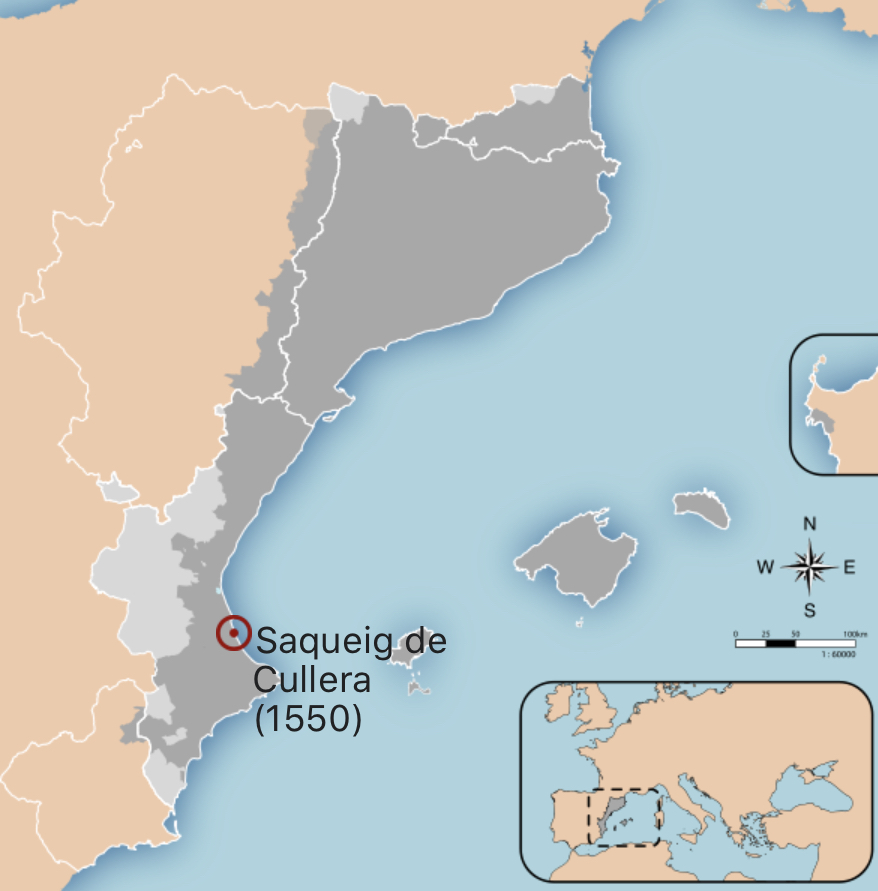
- Location of the sack of Cullera
Date	May 1550
Location	Cullera, Spain
Result	Ottoman victory

Belligerents
Ottoman Empire	Spain

Commanders and leaders
Dragut	Unknown

Strength
300 privateers	Unknown

Casualties and losses
Unknown	Almost all of the inhabitants are enslaved

The sack of Cullera, in Spain on the Mediterranean Sea, occurred on 20 May 1550, according to an entry made by a 16th century writer, Pere Joan Porcar; another account gives the date as 15 May 1550

In May 1550, the Ottoman general Dragut landed in Cullera, Valencia and sacked the city taking away many inhabitants in slavery. Dragut had just assaulted Benalmádena, Benissa and Sant Joan d'Alacant with 27 galleys, he then sailed to Valencia which he sacked before his assault on Cullera.

Dragut attacked Cullera at night with 300 men. Dragut sacked the city, seized goods from the people and took almost all of the inhabitants of the city as slaves. He kept the captives in a cave before taking them to a slave market in Algiers. This same cave now has a statue of Dragut and a museum commemorating his attack.

After his assault on Cullera he made his way to Majorca where he sacked Pollença, killing or capturing 130 people in the process. He then attacked Barenys in Sardinia where he destroyed the castle, set fire to the crops and took many captives.
