= Llaurí =

- Municipality
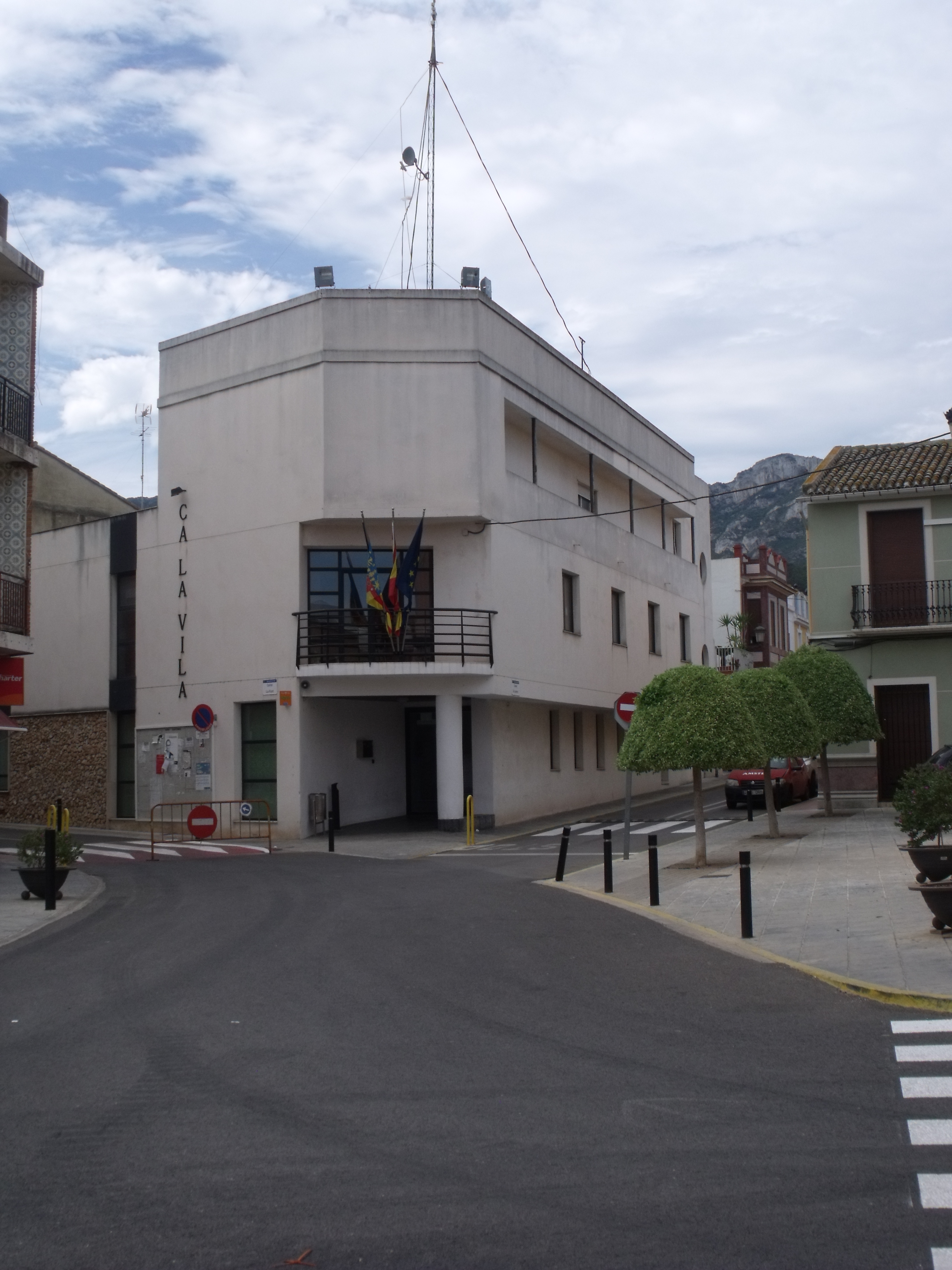
- Town hall

- Coat of arms

- Location in Spain
- Coordinates: 39°8′50″N 0°19′46″W
- Country: Spain
- Autonomous community: Valencian Community
- Province: Valencia
- Comarca: Ribera Baixa
- Judicial district: Sueca

Government
  - Alcalde: Juan Carlos Ribes

Area
  - Total: 13.6 km^{2} (5.3 sq mi)
- Elevation: 40 m (130 ft)

Population (2025-01-01)
  - Total: 1,226
  - Density: 90.1/km^{2} (233/sq mi)
- Demonym: Llaurinero/a
- Time zone: UTC+1 (CET)
  - Summer (DST): UTC+2 (CEST)
- Postal code: 46613
- Official language(s): Valencian
- Website: Official website

Llaurí is a municipality in the comarca of Ribera Baixa in the Valencian Community, Spain.

== See also ==
- List of municipalities in Valencia
