= Polinyà de Xúquer =

- Municipality
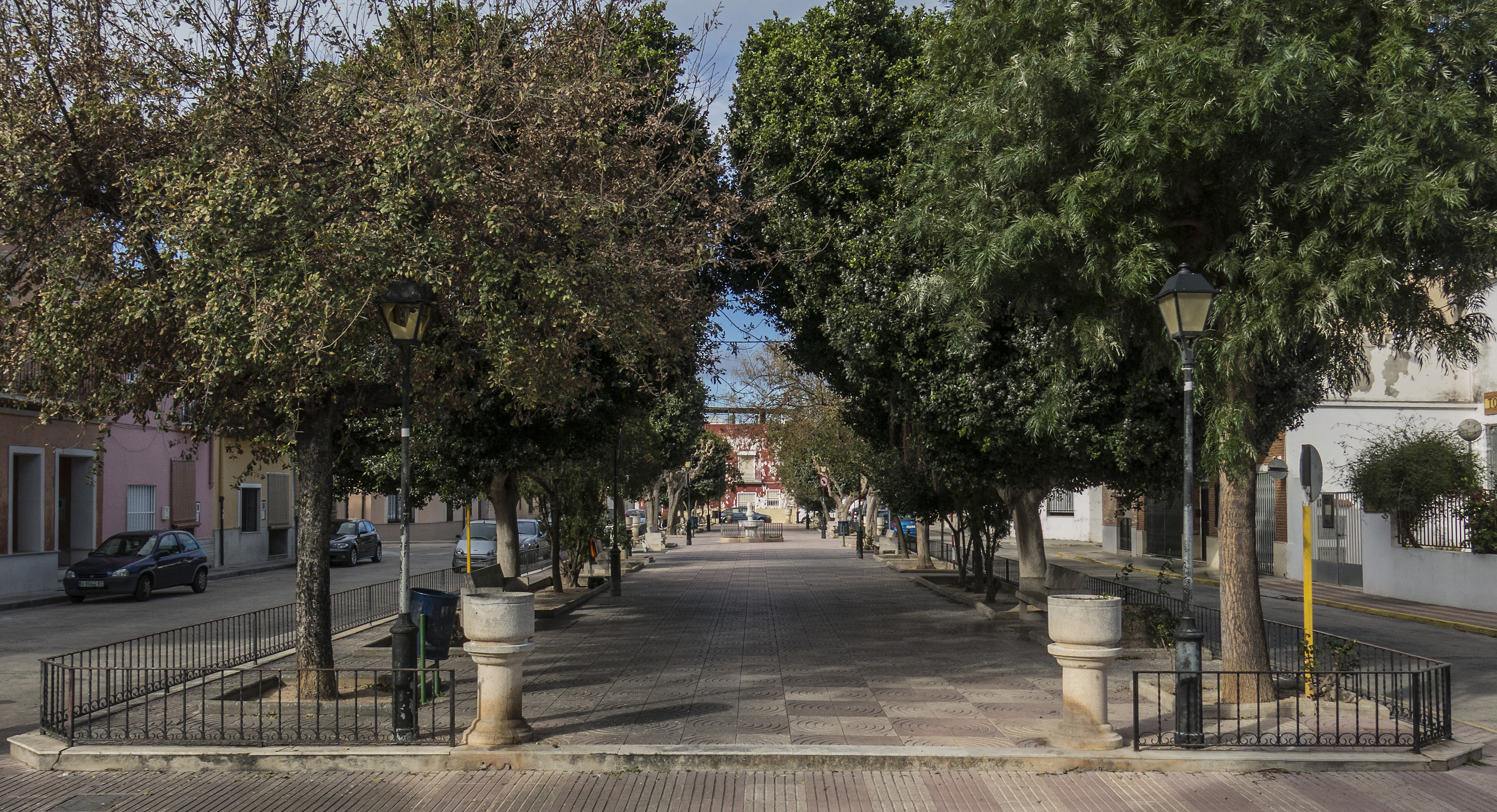

- Flag Coat of arms

- Location in Spain
- Coordinates: 39°11′53″N 0°22′6″W
- Country: Spain
- Autonomous community: Valencian Community
- Province: Valencia
- Comarca: Ribera Baixa
- Judicial district: Sueca

Government
  - Alcalde: Vicente Navarro Torres (EUPV)

Area
  - Total: 9.11 km^{2} (3.52 sq mi)
- Elevation: 12 m (39 ft)

Population (2025)
  - Total: 2,577
  - Density: 283/km^{2} (733/sq mi)
- Demonym: Poliñanero/a
- Time zone: UTC+1 (CET)
  - Summer (DST): UTC+2 (CEST)
- Postal code: 46688
- Official language(s): Valencian
- Website: Official website

Polinyà de Xúquer (Valencian pronunciation: [poliˈɲa ðe ˈ(t)ʃukeɾ], Spanish: Poliñá de Júcar) is a municipality in the comarca of Ribera Baixa in the Valencian Community, Spain.

== See also ==
- List of municipalities in Valencia
