= Favara, Spain =

Favara
- Municipality
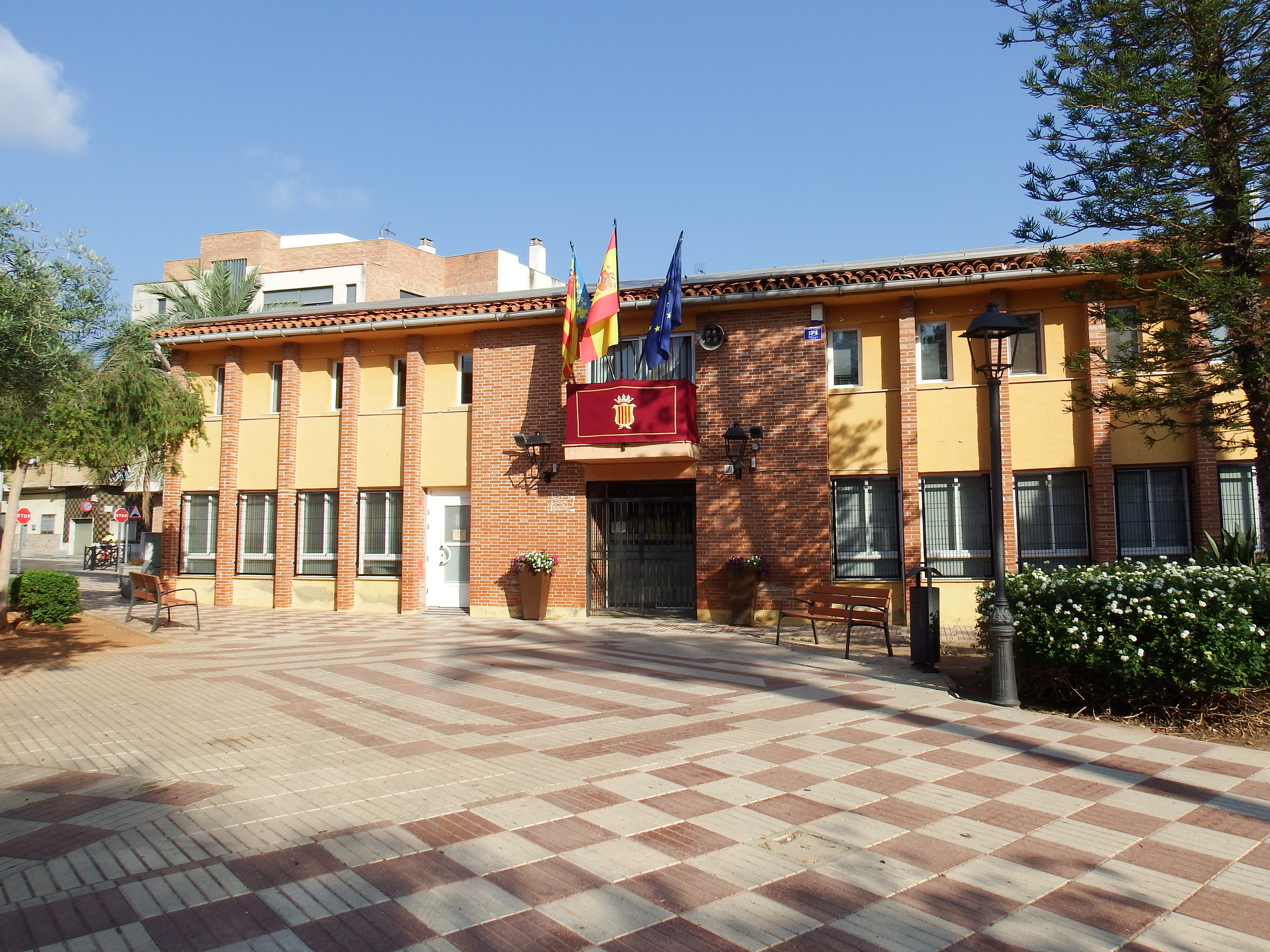
- Town hall

- Coat of arms

- Location in Spain
- Coordinates: 39°7′40″N 0°17′26″W
- Country: Spain
- Autonomous community: Valencian Community
- Province: Valencia
- Comarca: Ribera Baixa
- Judicial district: Sueca

Government
  - Mayor: Pedro Juan Victoria Miñana

Area
  - Total: 9.4 km^{2} (3.6 sq mi)
- Elevation: 12 m (39 ft)

Population (2025-01-01)
  - Total: 2,776
  - Density: 300/km^{2} (760/sq mi)
- Demonym: Favareros
- Time zone: UTC+1 (CET)
  - Summer (DST): UTC+2 (CEST)
- Postal code: 46614
- Official language(s): Valencian
- Website: Official website

Favara is a municipality in the comarca of Ribera Baixa in the Valencian Community, Spain.

== Geografy ==
It is 50km far from Valencia

== See also ==
- List of municipalities in Valencia
