= Sollana =

- Municipality
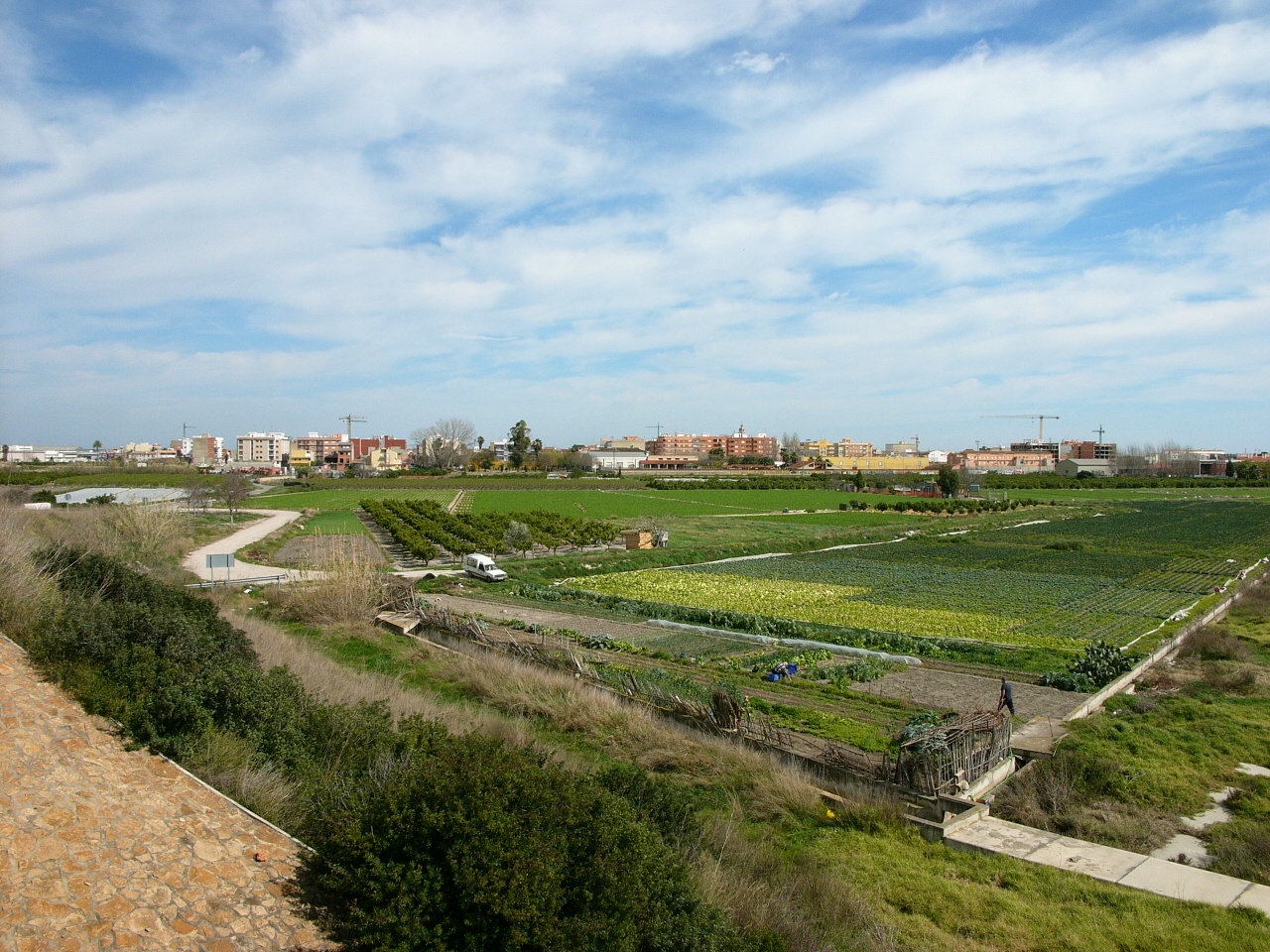

- Coat of arms

- Location in Spain
- Coordinates: 39°16′43″N 0°22′51″W
- Country: Spain
- Autonomous community: Valencian Community
- Province: Valencia
- Comarca: Ribera Baixa
- Judicial district: Sueca

Government
  - Alcalde: Alicia Hervás Serra

Area
  - Total: 39.2 km^{2} (15.1 sq mi)
- Elevation: 4 m (13 ft)

Population (2025-01-01)
  - Total: 5,089
  - Density: 130/km^{2} (336/sq mi)
- Demonym: Sollanero/a
- Time zone: UTC+1 (CET)
  - Summer (DST): UTC+2 (CEST)
- Postal code: 46430
- Official language(s): Valencian
- Website: Official website

Sollana is a municipality in the comarca of Ribera Baixa in the Valencian Community, Spain. The municipality includes a second village: El Romaní.

Situated on the floodplain of the Júcar River, the Sollana region is where rice was first grown in Spain 1,200 years ago, and is also the heartland of the famous Spanish dish paella. The economy of the area is still based mainly on agriculture: rice, oranges and livestock.

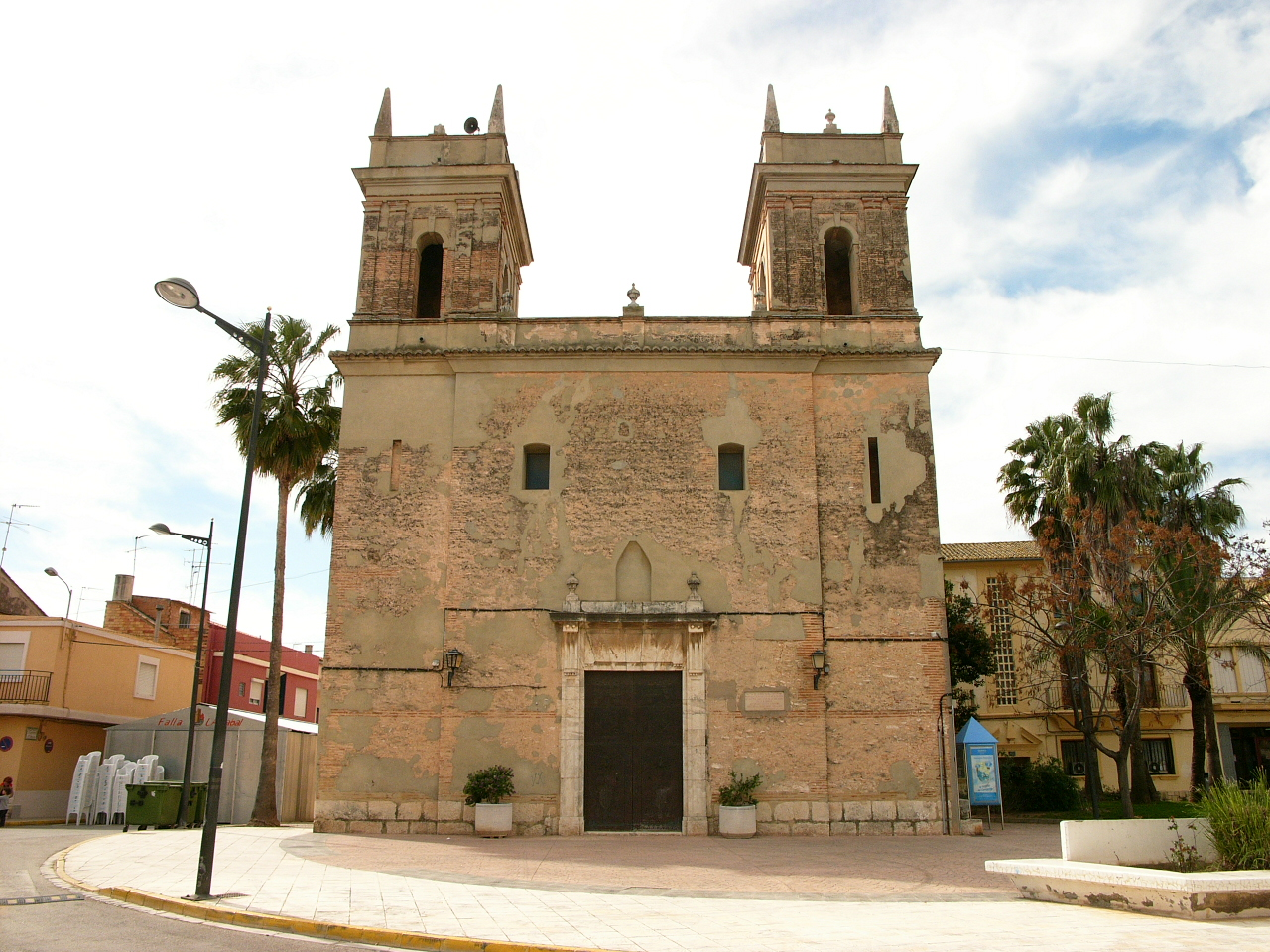
The Sisters of Mercy Convent in Sollana

In the early Middle Ages, Sollana was a small Visigothic settlement. Later, records from the al-Andalus period name it Sulyanah, chief village of a region including the hamlets of Romaní, Alcahecia and Trullás. After the Reconquista in the thirteenth century, James I of Aragon gave it to his vassal Ximén d'Urrea, and it eventually ended up part of the Dukedom of Híjar. In January 1932, during the Second Spanish Republic, anarchists briefly declared a Soviet Republic of Sollana.

The patron saint of Sollana is Mary Magdalene. She is celebrated annually in the summer festivities, which begin on her feast day, July 22, and continue through August 14, when the city council throws a "night of the paellas" in the city centre, and end in late August with a traditional bullring.

== Notable people ==
- Juan José López-Ibor (1906–1991), neuropsychiatrist

== See also ==
- List of municipalities in Valencia
