= Ramón de Trobat =

Ramon Trobat i Vinyes (died April 1698) was the son of Francesc Trobat i Trias and a native of Barcelona, where he trained in the law. During the Catalan Revolt of 1640, he sided with the rebels and served in the army. He came to the notice of the French, and served as an adviser to Cardinal Mazarin at the negotiations for the Peace of the Pyrenees. A prominent member of the French government in Roussillon after its annexation to France, he was named one of the original six councilors of the Sovereign Council on 7 June 1660, promoted to president à mortier on 24 November 1680, and named its first president 18 April 1691. In addition, he was an avocat général of the Sovereign Council from 1660 until 1681, when he was named intendant of Roussillon, a position he retained until his death in 1698.
