= Corbera =

- Municipality
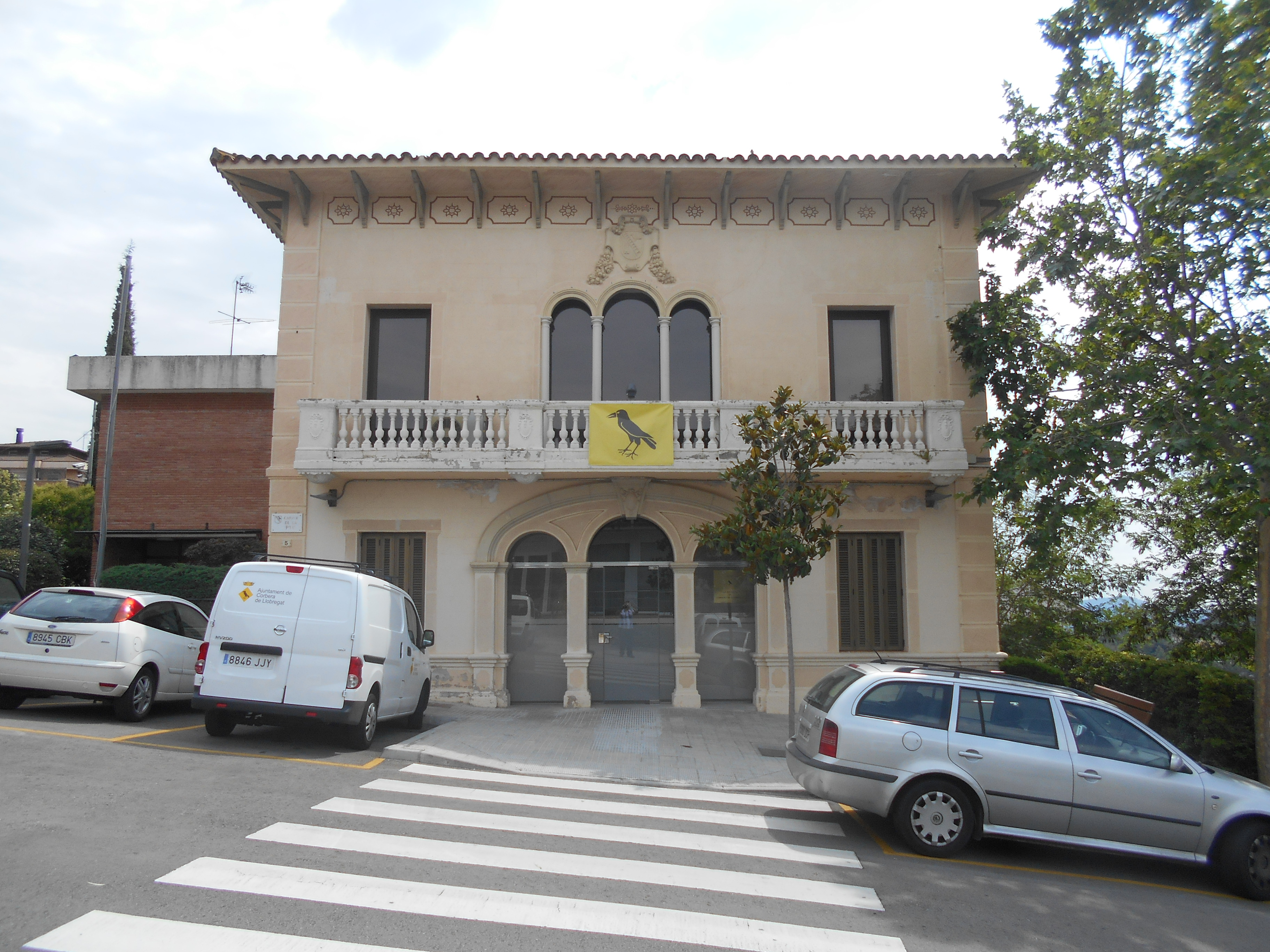
- Town hall

- Flag Coat of arms

- Location in Spain
- Coordinates: 39°9′30″N 0°21′16″W
- Country: Spain
- Autonomous community: Valencian Community
- Province: Valencia
- Comarca: Ribera Baixa
- Judicial district: Sueca

Government
  - Alcalde: Jordi Vicedo

Area
  - Total: 20.3 km^{2} (7.8 sq mi)
- Elevation: 17 m (56 ft)

Population (2025-01-01)
  - Total: 3,266
  - Density: 161/km^{2} (417/sq mi)
- Demonym(s): Corberanà, corberana
- Time zone: UTC+1 (CET)
  - Summer (DST): UTC+2 (CEST)
- Postal code: 46612
- Official language(s): Valencian
- Website: Official website

Corbera is a municipality in the comarca of Ribera Baixa in the Valencian Community, Spain.

== See also ==
- List of municipalities in Valencia
