= Ribera Baixa =

Coordinates: 39.2158°N 0.347442°W

Ribera Baixa Ribera Baja
- Comarca
- Country: Spain
- Autonomous community: Valencian Community
- Province: València / Valencia
- Capital and largest city: Sueca
- Municipalities: 12 municipalities: Albalat de la Ribera, Almussafes, Benicull de Xúquer, Corbera, Cullera, Favara, Fortaleny, Llaurí, Polinyà de Xúquer, Riola, Sollana, Sueca

Area
  - Total: 276.81 km^{2} (106.88 sq mi)

Population (2006)
  - Total: 79,221
  - Density: 286.19/km^{2} (741.24/sq mi)
- Time zone: UTC+1 (CET)
  - Summer (DST): UTC+2 (CEST)

Ribera Baixa (Valencian: [riˈbeɾa ˈbajʃa]; Spanish: Ribera Baja [riˈβeɾa ˈβaxa]) is a comarca in the province of Valencia, Valencian Community, Spain.

== Municipalite ==
Ribera Baixa contains the following 12 municipalities:

Municipalities of Ribera Baixa

- Albalat de la Ribera
- Almussafes
- Benicull de Xúquer
- Corbera
- Cullera
- Favara
- Fortaleny
- Llaurí
- Polinyà de Xúquer
- Riola
- Sollana
- Sueca
