= Pao Ong Hu Temple =

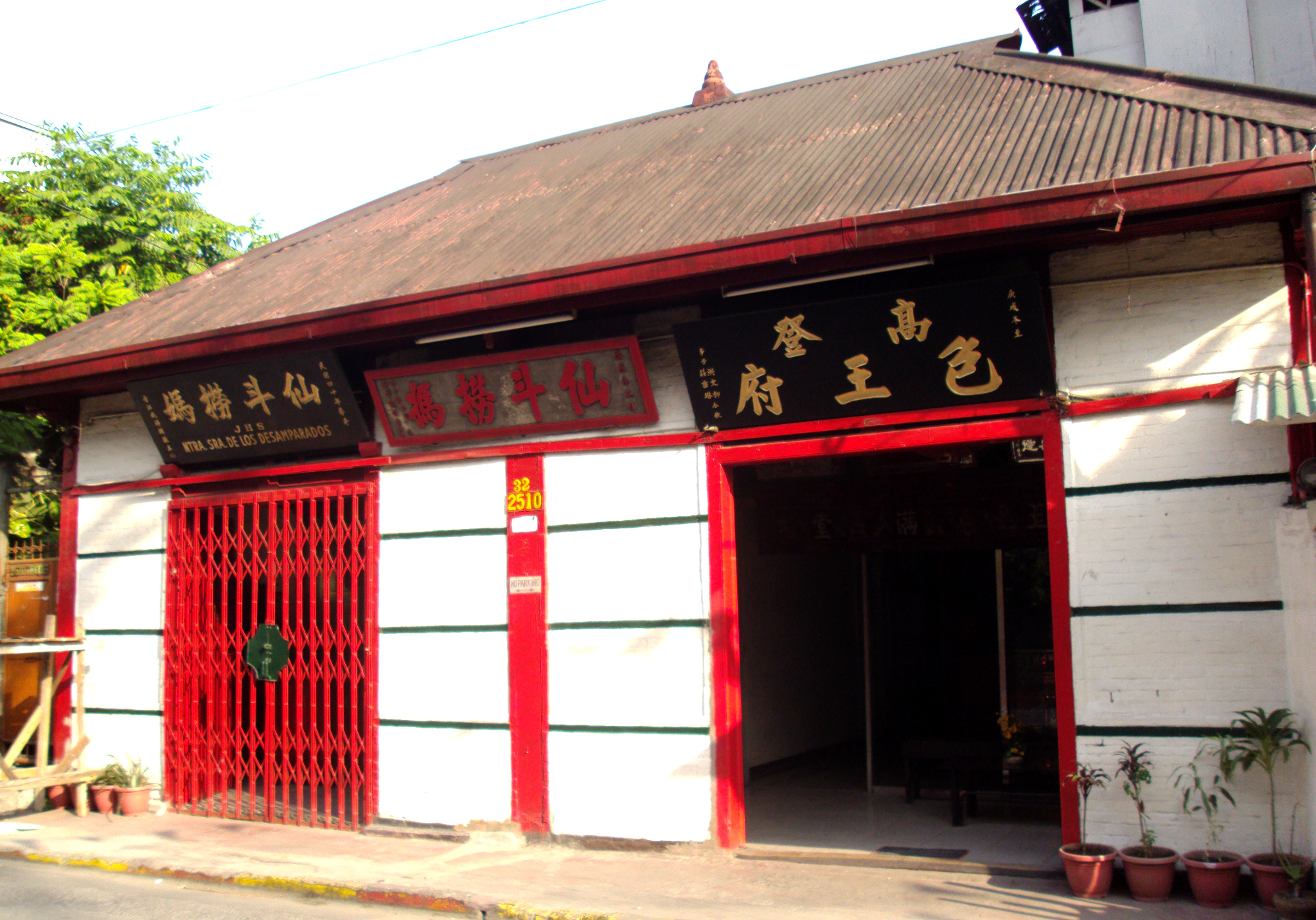

Religion
- Affiliation: Taoism; Roman Catholic; Buddhism (Religious syncretism)
- Region: Metro Manila
- Deity: Pao Ong Hu and Mazu (Taoism); Kuanyin (Buddhism)
- Patron: Santa Ana Lao Ma (Our Lady of the Abandoned) (Roman Catholicism)
- Year consecrated: 1951

Location
- Location: Santa Ana, Manila
- Country: Philippines
- Interactive map of Pao Ong Hu Temple
- Coordinates: 14°34′53.4″N 121°00′49.7″E

Architecture
- Style: Chinese temple architecture

Pao Ong Hu Temple is a Chinese temple in Santa Ana, Manila, Philippines.

== Background ==
The Pao Ong Hu Temple was dedicated in 1951, but the temple has acknowledged gifts of dedication as early as 1928. It was declared as an Important Cultural Property (ICP) in 2016. It was built near the Santa Ana Church.

The place has served as a place of worship for Filipinos, both of Chinese descent and those without Chinese heritage. Religious syncretism defines the temple which accommodates a mixture of Roman Catholic, Taoist and Buddhist beliefs. The temple is dedicated to the Taoist deity Pao Ong Hu but it has a second shrine for the reverence for the Roman Catholic patroness of Santa Ana Church, the Our Lady of the Abandoned otherwise known as Santa Ana Lao Ma. In Taoism the patroness is known as the goddess Mazu, in Buddhism she is referred to as Kuanyin.

In January 2021, a petition was filed to delist the temple as an ICP following a transfer of ownership of the temple. Heritage conservationists groups opposed the move.

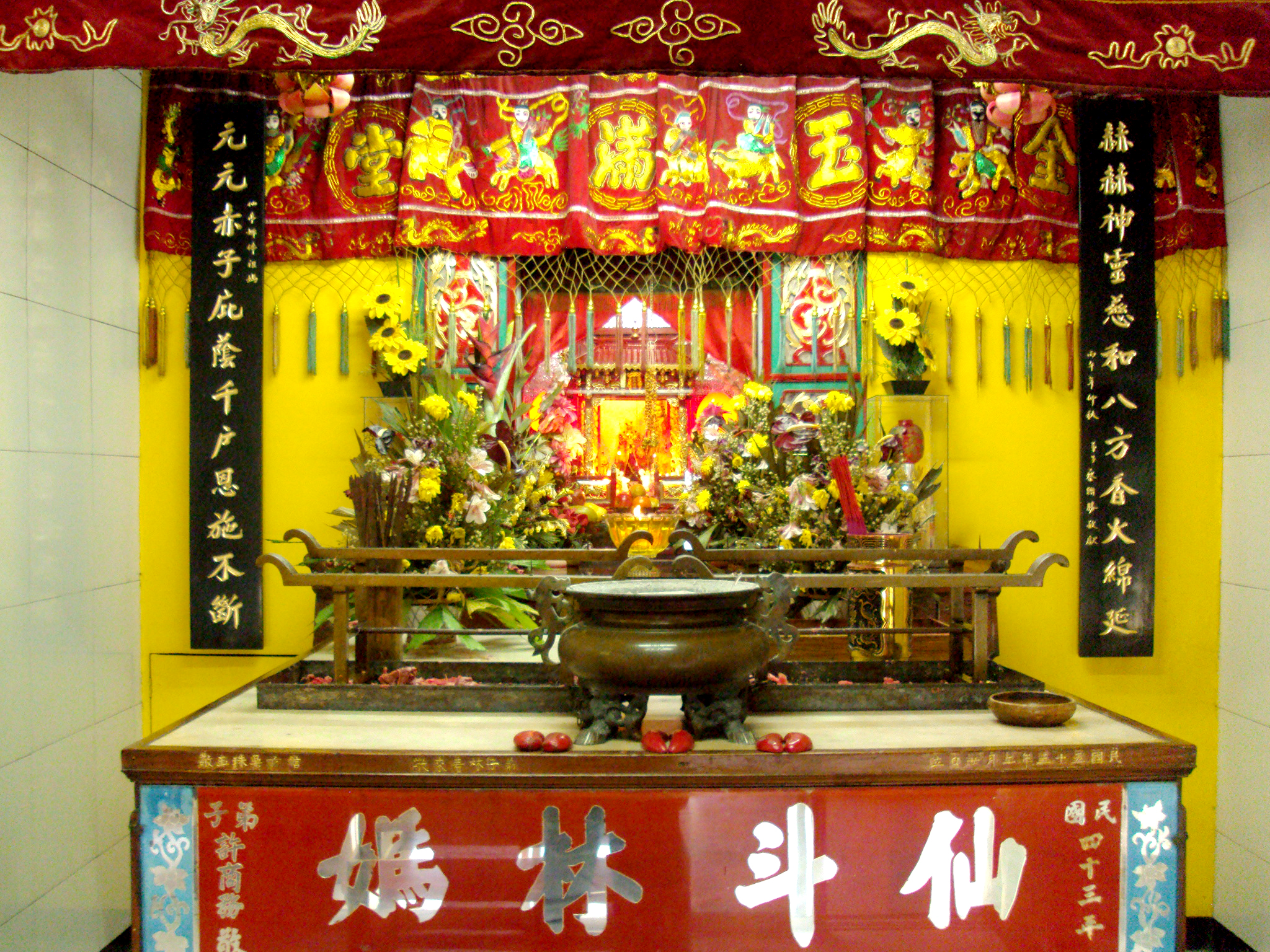
Altar dedicated to the Our Lady of the Abandoned

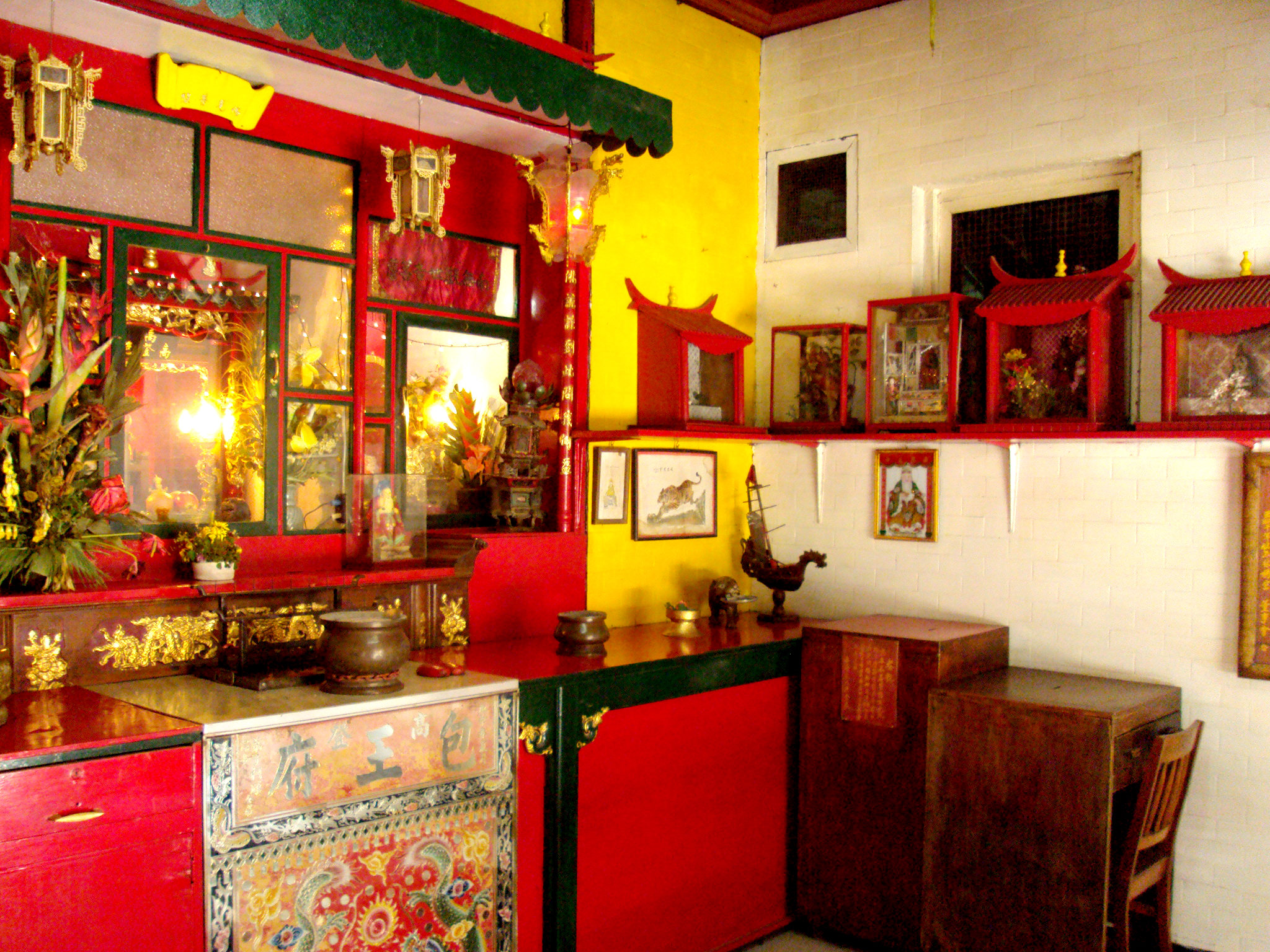
Altar dedicated to Pao Ong Hu

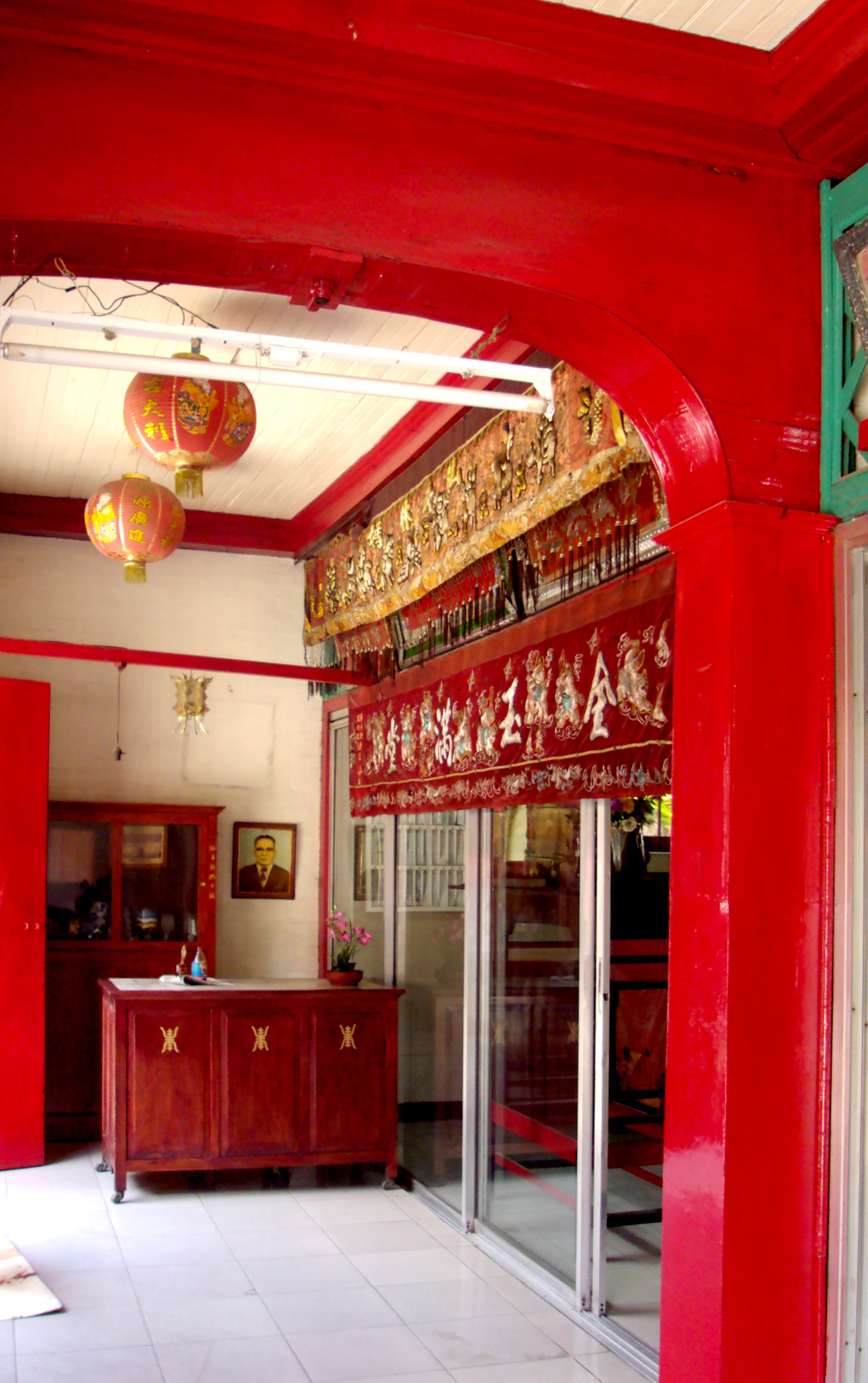
Temple interior
