= Plaza of the Virgin =

- Plaça de la Mare de Déu
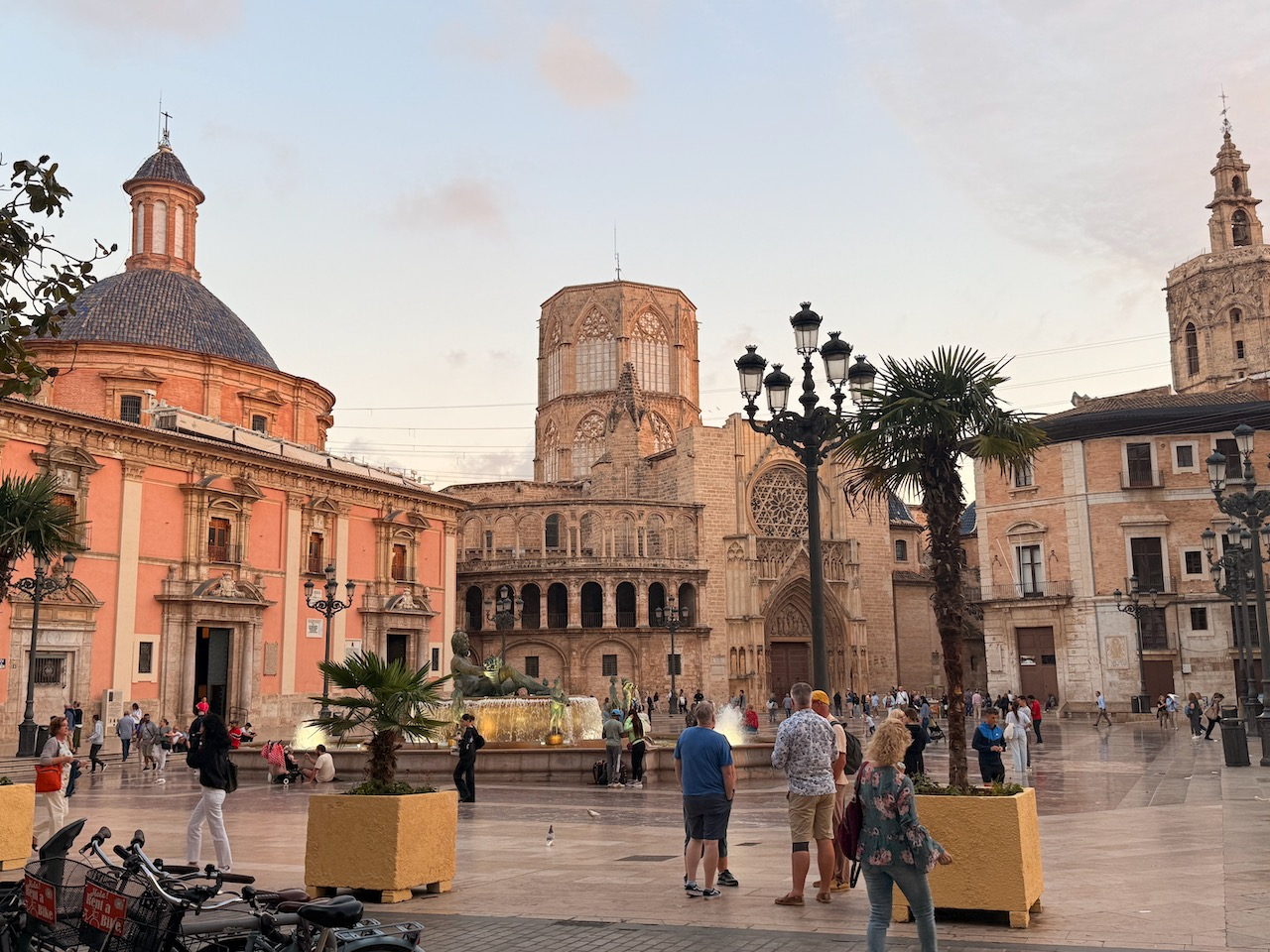
- Plaza of the Virgin in Valencia with view of the cathedral and basilica
- Interactive map of the Plaza of the Virgin area
- Alternative names: Plaça de la Verge (ca), Plaza de la Virgen (es)

General information
- Location: Valencia, Valencian Community, Spain
- Coordinates: 39.476495°N 0.375335°W
- Owner: City Council of Valencia

The Plaza of the Virgin, (Valencian: Plaça de la Mare de Déu or Plaça de la Verge; Spanish: Plaza de la Virgen) is one of the oldest public spaces in Valencia. The plaza is situated over the remains of the Roman Forum from the original establishment of the city in 138 BCE. Remains from the Roman period are mounted on the wall of the Basilica. The plaza is bordered by the Valencia Cathedral, the Basilica of Our Lady of the Forsaken, and the Palace of the Generalitat Valenciana.

Of the many events that occur in the plaza, The Water Tribunal is most frequent as it meets most Thursdays at noon in front of the catherdral's Doorway of the Apostles, which faces the plaza. For this reason, the plaza features a fountain constructed by Manuel Silvestre de Edeta (ca) to celebrate the millennial anniversary of the Water Tribunal. The sculpture has a recumbent male form representing the Turia River, and maidens with amphorae representing the nine irrigation canals governed by the tribunal.

The plaza is also the site of the annual Offering of the Flowers to Our Lady of the Forsaken, the display of Las Rocas ahead of the Corpus Christi procession, and the presentations ahead of the procession for the Festival of Our Lady of the Forsaken.

== History ==
When the city was established by the Roman Republic during the consulate of Decimus Junius Brutus Callaicus in 138 BCE, the forum was established near the crossing of the Cardo and the Decumanus streets. In 75 BCE, the city was destroyed by Gnaeus Pompeius Magnus during Sulla's civil war. Archeologists maintain that the forum has been located in approximately the same place when the city was re-established in the reign of Augustus.

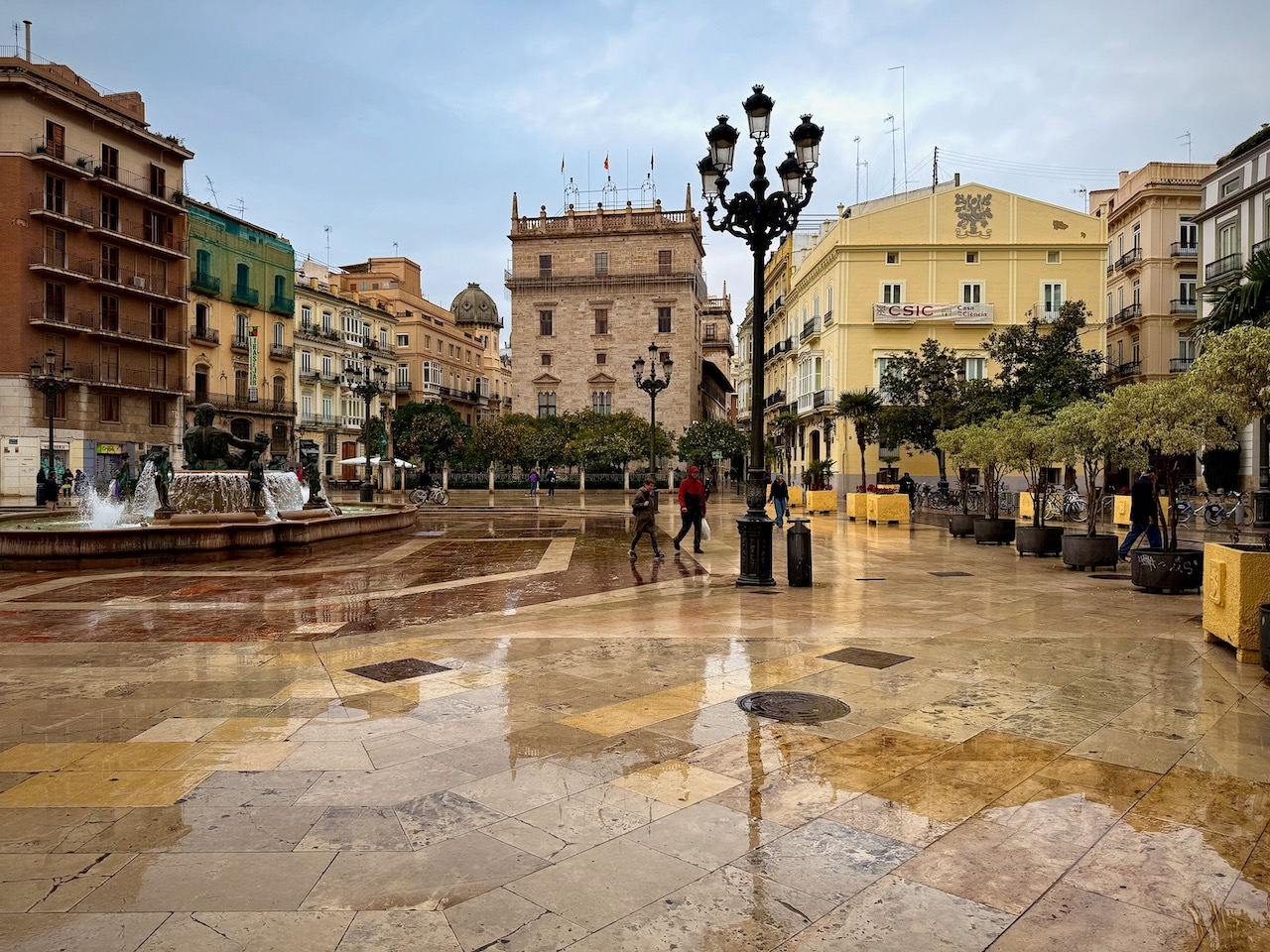
Plaza of the Virgin and the Generalitat building in the rain

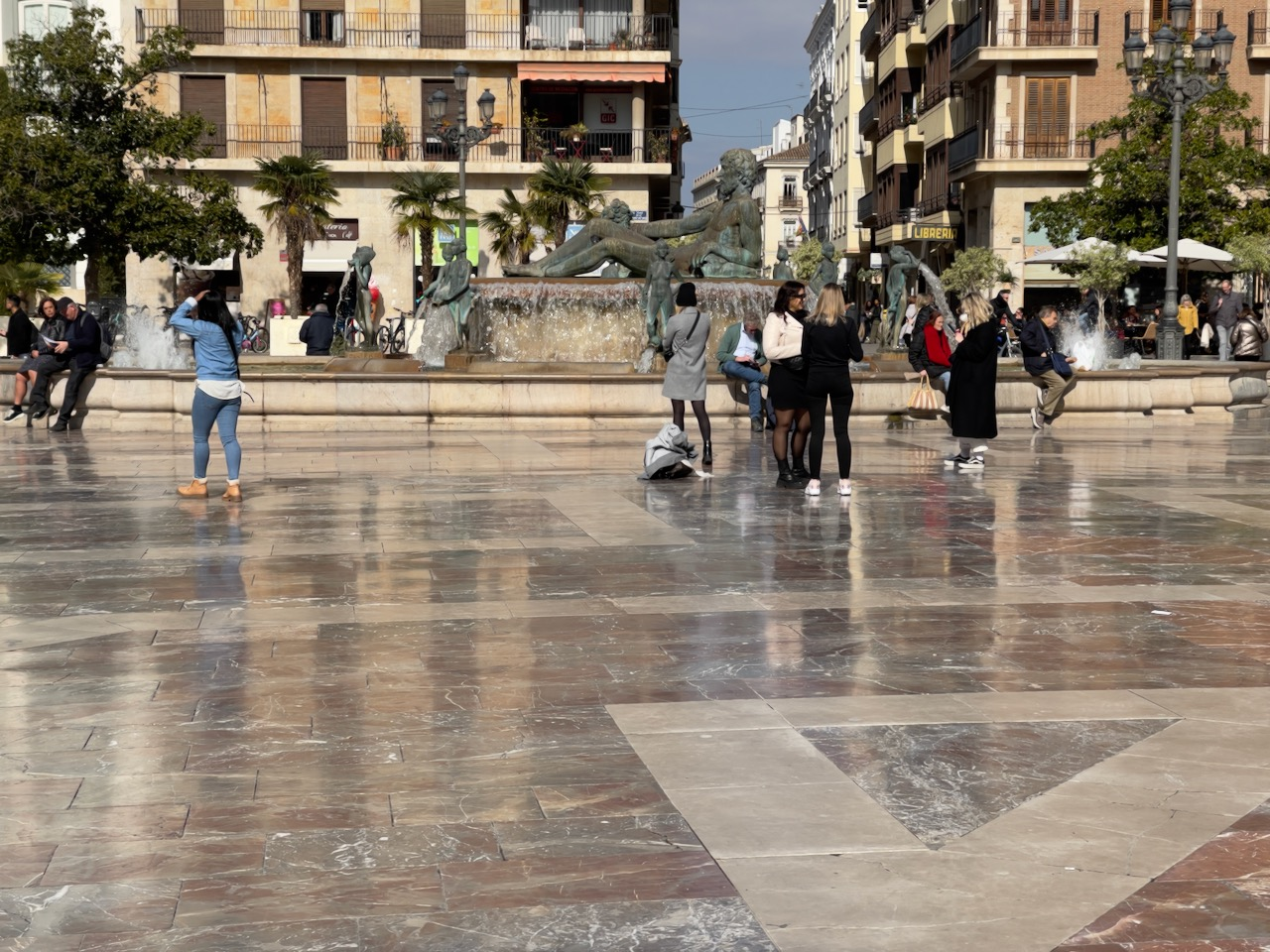
Fountain of the Turia in the Plaza of the Virgin

== Events ==
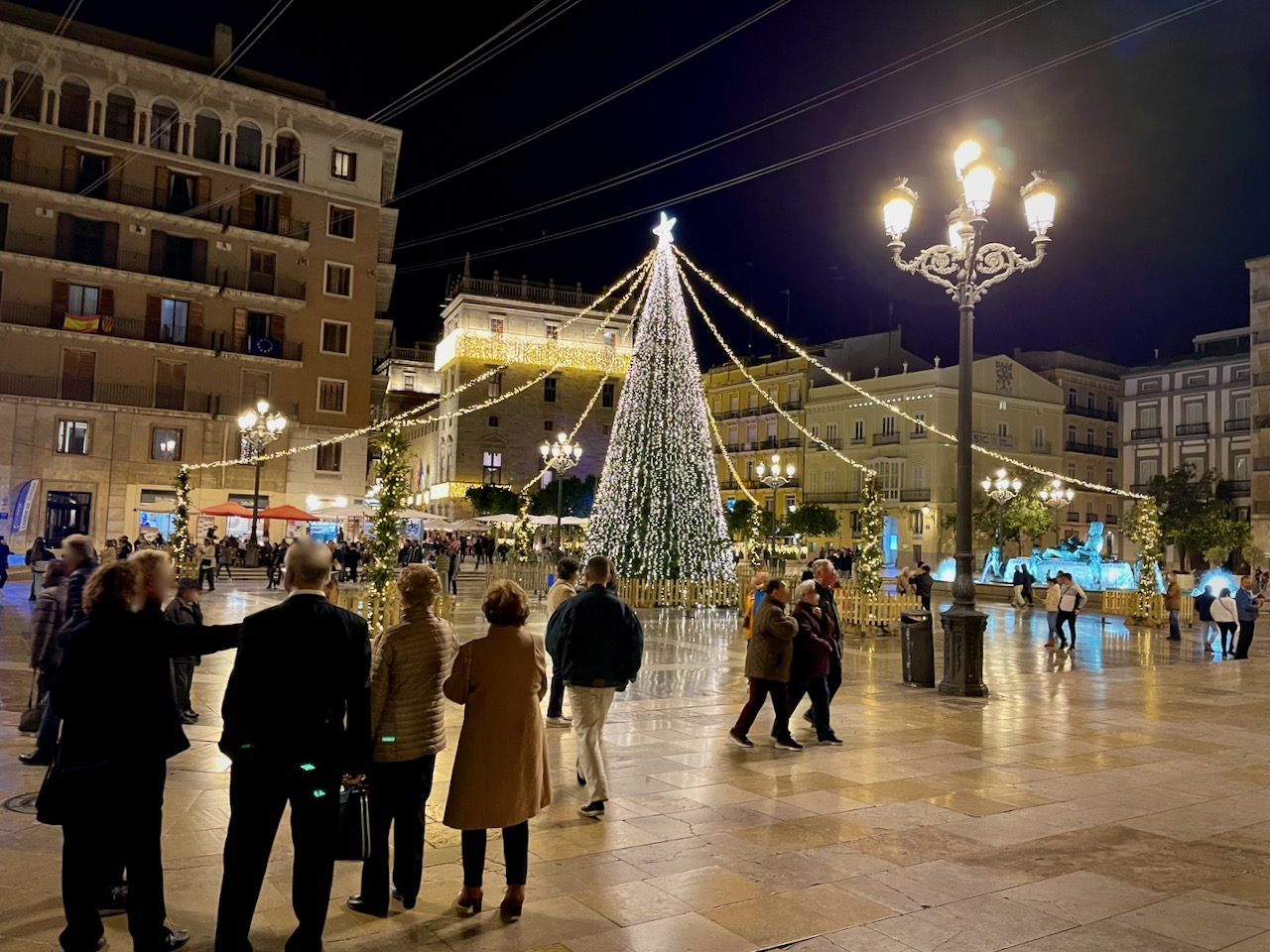
Christmas in the Plaza of the Virgin

=== Water Tribunal ===
The Water Tribunal of the plain of Valencia, also known as the Tribunal of the Waters (Valencian: Tribunal de les Aigües de València), is an institution of justice to settle disputes arising from the use of irrigation water by farmers in several irrigation communities or Comunitats de Regants (ca) and nine canals (Quart, Benàger i Faitanar, Tormos, Mislata, Mestalla, Favara, Rascanya, Rovella and Xirivella) in the Horta of Valencia. It is the world’s oldest court and arguably the oldest democratic institution in Europe. The tribunal meets each Thursday at noon in the cathedral Doorway of the Apostles (es).

=== Floral Offering ===
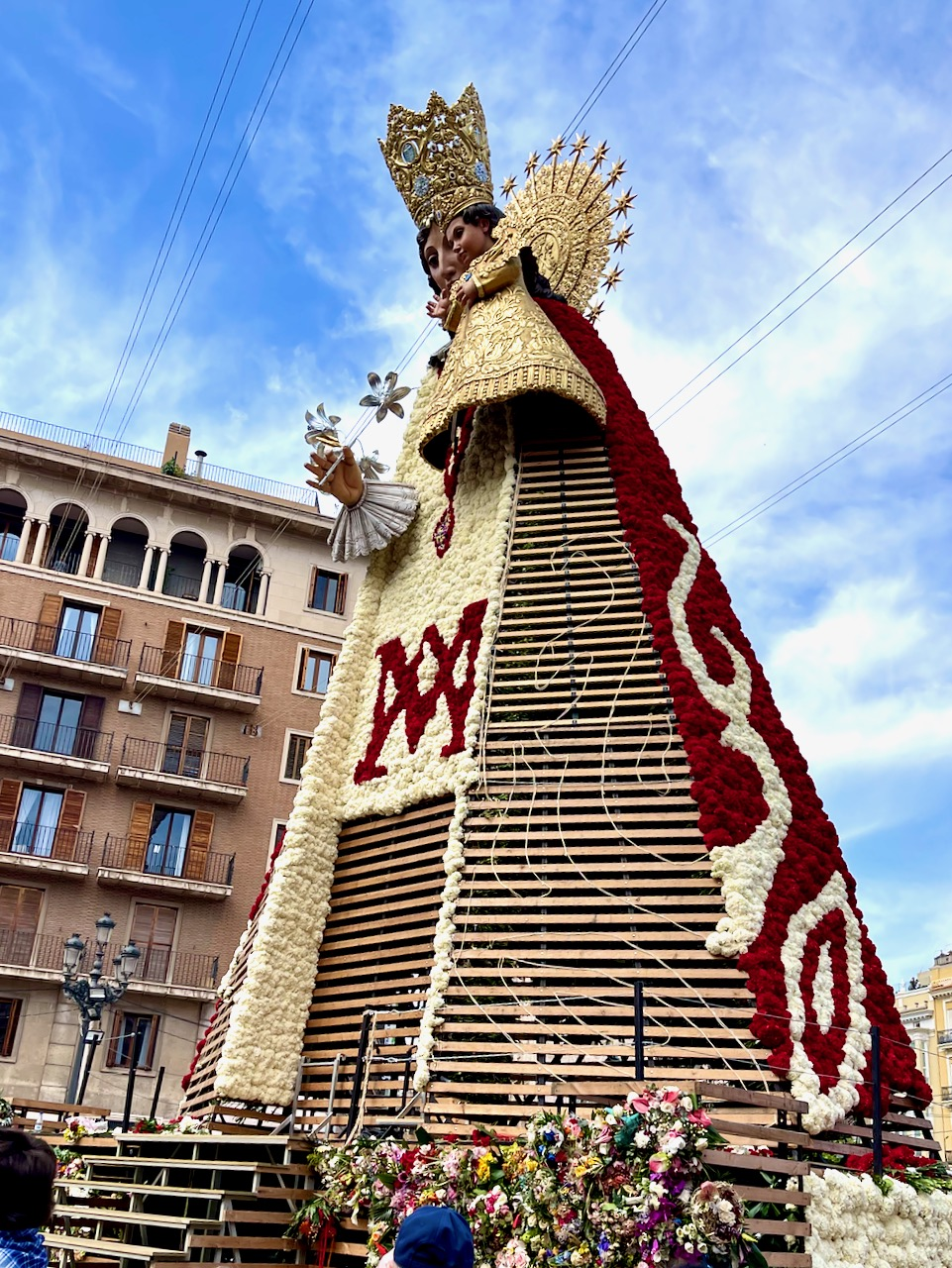
The offering of the flowers in progress - Fallas 2024

During Valencia's Fallas festival, one of the significant events is the Offering of the Flowers (Valencian: L'ofrena de flors). A lattice structure approximately four stories tall is formed for the dress of a large replica of Our Lady of the Forsaken. The dress is filled with flowers brought in procession by the members of each Casal that participates in Fallas. This ceremony takes two days for over 120,000 participants to process through the Plaza Reina to the Plaza de la Virgen where they offer their flowers that are taken by a team who use them to fill the lattice of the dress of the statue. In 2026, the number of participants grew to such a level that there is discussion about extending to a third day of processions.

=== Corpus Christi ===
The plaza is an important part of the celebration of the Feast of Corpus Christi, which is celebrated the Sunday immediately following the 60th day after Easter. The celebration in Valencia celebrated 700 years in 2026, having begun in 1326. One of the significant aspects of the procession are Las Rocas which are sculptural floats or barges that are pulled through the procession by horses in traditional Valencian tack. The floats are moved from their storage barn, La Casa de las Rocas that is also a museum to the Plaza of the Virgin where they are displayed before the procession. The floats date from 1511 through to 2001 and there is some controversy about how to go about restoring and protecting them.

=== Festival of Our Lady of the Forsaken ===
Our Lady of the Forsaken (Valencian: Mare de Déu dels Desemparats) is a religious icon held in the Basilica of Our Lady of the Forsaken, which fronts onto the square. The icon began its life in the chapel of the first mental health hospital in Europe. The image of the Virgin of the Forsaken was so revered, that by the sixteenth century, when massive works were undertaken at the hospital, the bishop of Valencia ordered the construction of the current basilica. Now, every May, the statue of the virgin is moved from the basilica to the cathedral in a formal procession.
