= Basilica of Our Lady of the Forsaken =

Catholic minor basilica in Valencia, Spain

Basílica de la Virgen de los Desamparados
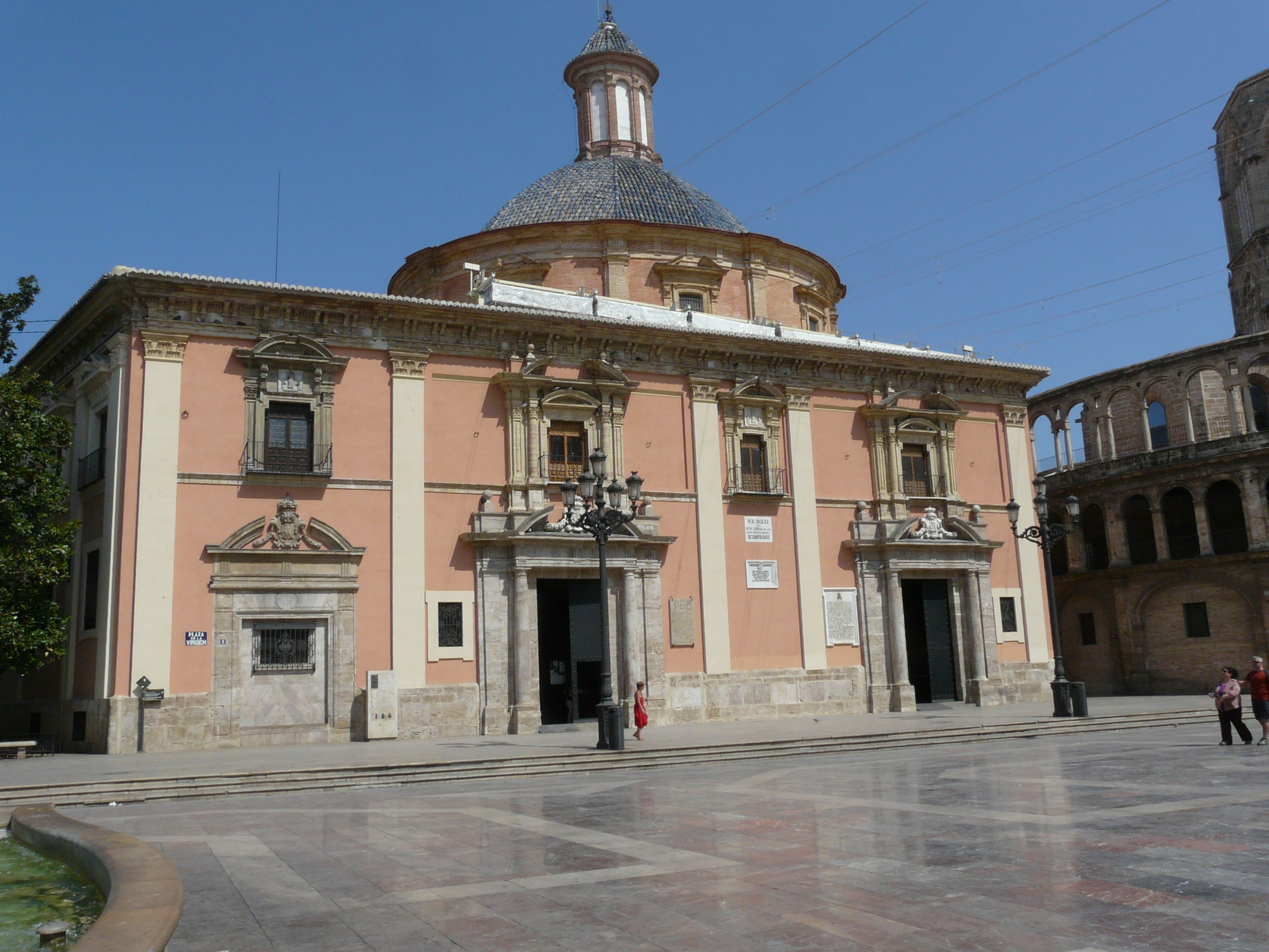
- Principal Facade, Basílica de la Virgen de los Desamparados

Religion
- Affiliation: Catholic Church
- Diocese: Valencia
- Status: Minor Basilica

Location
- Location: Valencia, Spain
- State: Valencian Community
- Interactive map of Basílica de la Virgen de los Desamparados
- Coordinates: 39°28′35″N 0°22′29″W

Architecture
- Style: Spanish Renaissance architecture,Spanish Baroque architecture
- Completed: 1666

Website
- basilicadesamparados.org

The Royal Basilica of Our Lady of the Forsaken (Spanish: Real Basílica de la Virgen de los Desamparados; Valencian: Basílica de la Mare de Déu dels Desemparats) is located in the city of Valencia, Spain. It is the sanctuary of the Lady of the Forsaken, Patron Saint of Valencia and of the entire Old Kingdom of Valencia, current Valencian Community. It holds the dignity of a basilica thanks to the papal brief signed by SS. Pius XII on April 21, 1948.

== Situation and context ==
The basilica is located at the highest point of the city and, with the Cathedral, it forms one of the most significant sites in the city's historic center. Specifically, it is located in the Plaza of the Virgin, in front of the allegorical fountain of the Turia River and its nine irrigation canals.

Two of its doors open onto this square, and a third opens onto the passage that separates the basilica from the Cathedral, the two connected by an upper arch. This third door has a small barred window through which the interior and the illuminated statue of the Lady of the Forsaken can be seen when the basilica is closed. Nearby archaeological excavations indicate that the area where the Basilica is located corresponds to the Roman forum of the city of Valencia. In fact, several ashlars on the main façade of the Basilica contain tombstones and inscriptions from the Roman period.

== Layout ==
The plan is a trapezoid with an ellipse into and its intersection with a centered cross. The oval plan contained in a closed box can be related to the Church of Sant'Anna dei Palafrenieri by Vignola.

The spatial layout is clearly Renaissance, and is very similar to the double cube of San Pietro in Montorio and St. Peter's in Rome. The design and proportion of the dome are comparable to those of the Treasury of Atreus from 1400 BC, and to that of Brunelleschi in Santa Maria del Fiore from 1420.

Its relationship with the surroundings is established from a prominent position, rising five steps, and topped by a dome with a lantern, seeking its symbolism in the city's skyline, following the dictates of Alberti and Palladio.

== Interior ==
=== Palomino's frescoes ===
The oval dome is fully covered by frescoes painted by Antonio Palomino in 1701, a court painter to Charles II, and considered fundamental to the mural production of the Spanish Baroque.

Palomino also was commissioned to create the ceiling of the cloister (with its balconies and columns) that can be seen today inside the Basilica.

=== Images ===
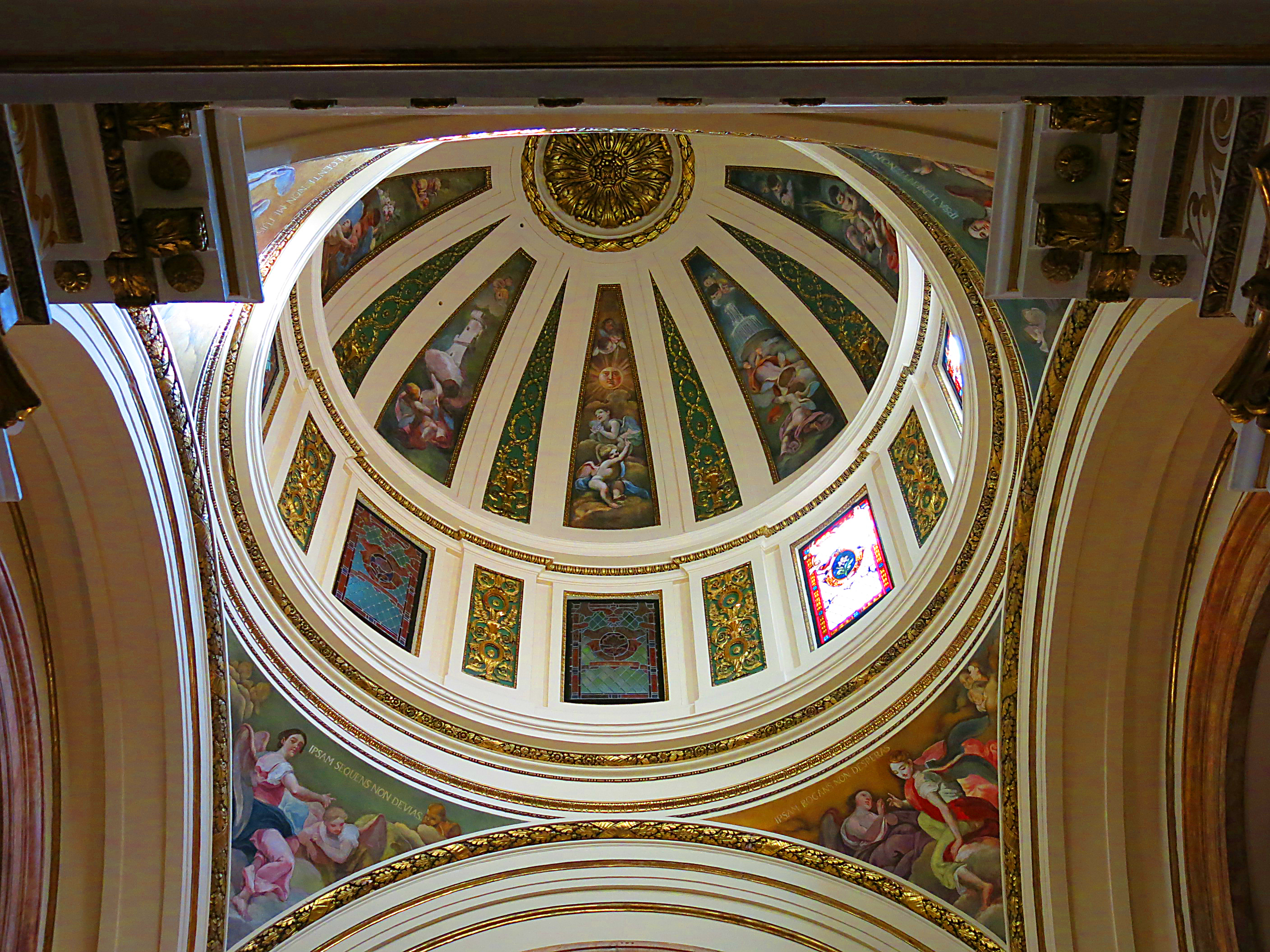
View of the dressing room dome.

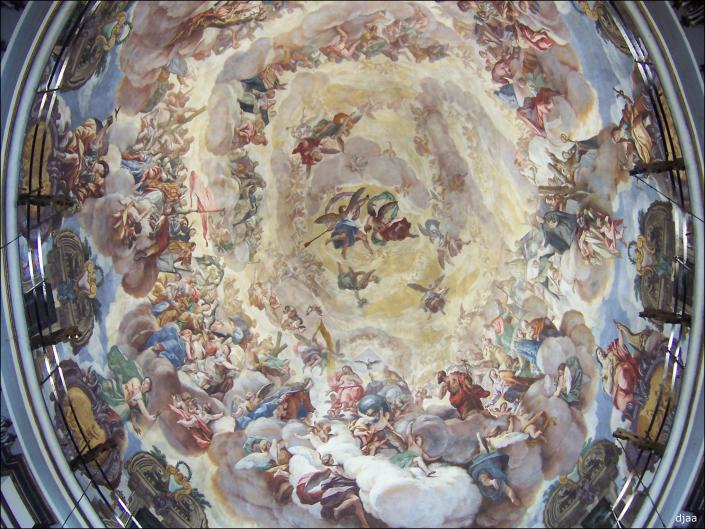
Palomino's frescoes general view.

== See also ==
- 17th-century Western domes
