= Santa Ana Church (Manila) =

Roman Catholic church in Manila, Philippines

- National Shrine of Our Lady of the Abandoned
- Pambansáng Dambana ng Iná ng Waláng Mag-aampón (Filipino); Santuario Nacional de Nuestra Señora de los Desamparados (Spanish); Sanctuarium Nationale de Beata Maria Virgine a Desertorum (Latin)
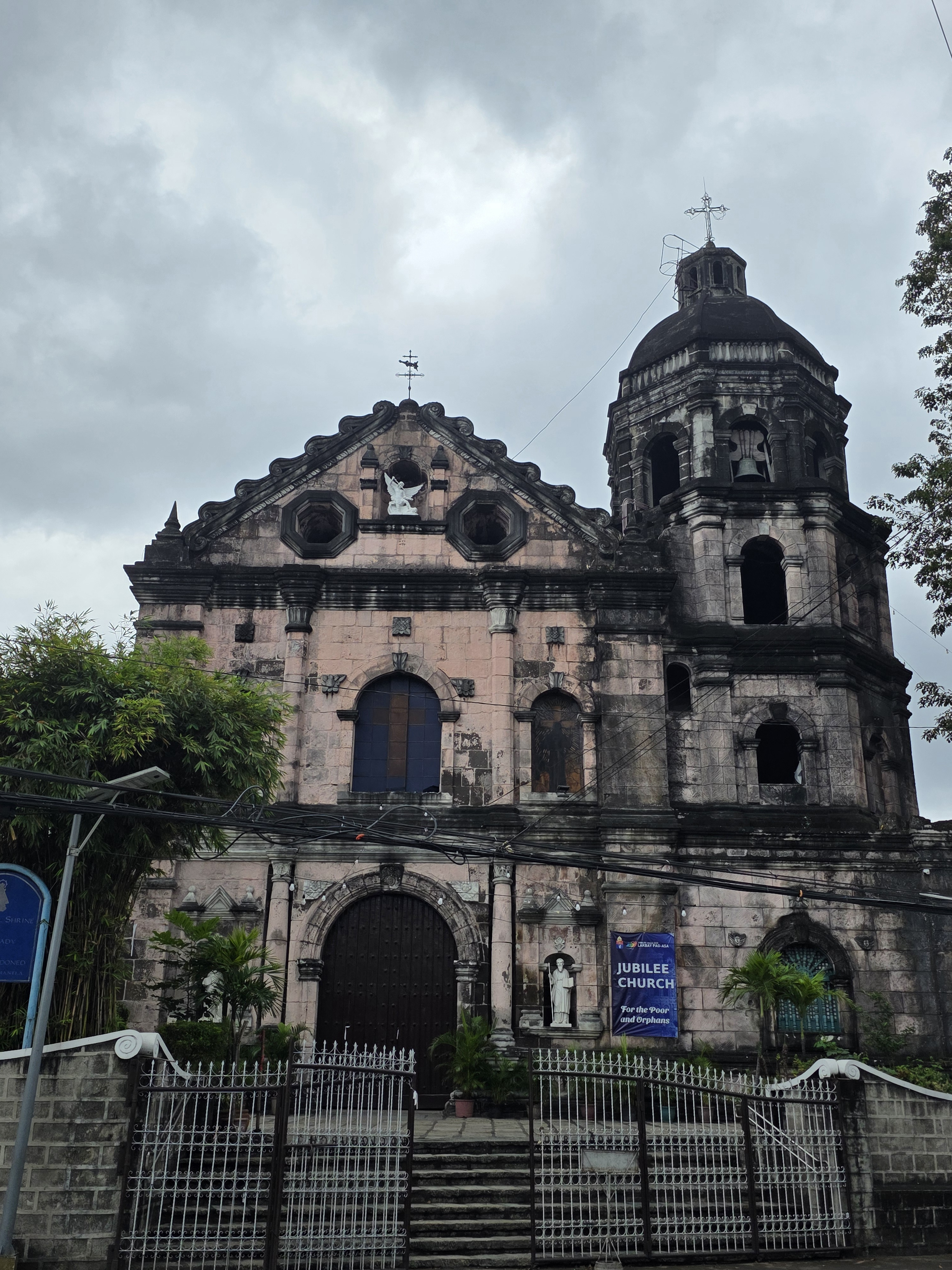
- Church facade in 2026
- Santa Ana Church
- 14°34′55″N 121°00′49″E
- Location: New Panaderos Street, Santa Ana, Manila
- Country: Philippines
- Denomination: Roman Catholic

History
- Former name: Our Lady of the Abandoned Parish
- Status: National Shrine
- Founded: 1578
- Founder: Vicente Inglés
- Dedication: Our Lady of the Abandoned

Architecture
- Functional status: Active
- Heritage designation: National Cultural Treasure
- Architectural type: Church building
- Style: Baroque
- Groundbreaking: September 12, 1720
- Completed: 1725
- Construction cost: ₱ 33,000

Specifications
- Length: 63 m (207 ft)
- Width: 30 m (98 ft)
- Materials: Adobe blocks

Administration
- Archdiocese: Manila
- Deanery: Holy Family
- Parish: Our Lady of the Abandoned

Clergy
- Rector: Rev. Fr. Virgilio Del Mundo, Jr., OFM

The National Shrine of Our Lady of the Abandoned, (Note: Filipino: Pambansang Dambana ng Ina ng Walang Mag-ampon; Spanish: Santuario Nacional de Nuestra Señora de los Desamparados) also known as Santa Ana Church, (Note: Filipino: Simbahan ng Santa Ana; Spanish: Iglesia de Santa Ana; Latin: Ecclesiae Paroecialis a Sancta Annae, Matris B.V.M.) is a Spanish colonial period Roman Catholic church located in the district of Santa Ana in Manila, Philippines. It is under the jurisdiction of the Archdiocese of Manila. The parish was established by the Franciscan missionaries in 1578 under the patronage of Saint Anne. The present stone church was constructed by Vicente Inglés from 1720 to 1725 and dedicated to its present patron, Our Lady of the Abandoned. The revered image of its patron was made in Valencia, Spain in 1713, and arrived in the Philippines in 1717.

The church houses two National Cultural Treasures declared by the National Museum of the Philippines: the Santa Ana Site Museum located in the convent patio, and the Camarín de la Virgen (“Dressing Room of the Virgin”). It was elevated to the rank of national shrine in 2021.

== History ==
The town of Santa Ana was first established by the Spanish Franciscan missionaries in 1578, in a settlement beside a creek connecting to the Pasig River, which the local inhabitants referred to as Sapà in the ancient Tagalog kingdom of Namayan. Its first church, dedicated to their titular patroness Saint Anne, after the similar-sounding Namayan, was made of nipa and bamboo until a decree from the colonial government in 1599 permitted the religious order to build the church in stone. However, the construction came only around 1720 upon the direction of then parish priest of Santa Ana, Vicente Inglés, wherein a new site was chosen, which is the current location of the structure. Dedicated to Our Lady of the Abandoned (Nuestra Señora de los Desamparados), the building of the stone church began on September 12, 1720, with the laying of the cornerstone by Governor-General and Archbishop of Manila Francisco de la Cuesta. Construction took five years to finish, with the total cost amounting to ₱33,000 including the donation of ₱4,000 by the Governor-General.

In the early 1700s, Inglés went to Valencia, Spain. The friar had been very enamored of a famous image of Our Lady that had become a popular spiritual attraction in Valencia known as the Our Lady of the Abandoned, comforting those whose loved ones have died. While Inglés was in Valencia in 1713, he decided to have a copy of this image for Santa Ana Parish, which was in the process of being constructed near Manila. After reverently touching the copy to the original image, the friar brought the new replica with him back to the Philippines in 1717. The image has been venerated in Santa Ana since then. In time, the parish became known by present name of Our Lady of the Abandoned Parish, though Saint Anne still is honored with a statue of her and the Child Mary in the reredos niche directly above that of Our Lady of the Abandoned. Governor-General De la Cuesta offered his bastón de mando to the image, and proclaimed her Gobernadora de la Ciudad de Manila ("Governoress of the City of Manila").

Santa Ana Church also served as barracks for wounded American soldiers during the Philippine–American War in 1899. As a result, some of its records were lost in the process. The church complex was not destroyed by any bombs during the Battle of Manila in 1945.

The Catholic Bishops' Conference of the Philippines approved the petition to elevate the church to a national shrine in January 2020. The solemn declaration was held on May 12, 2021, the church’s titular feast day.

== Architecture ==
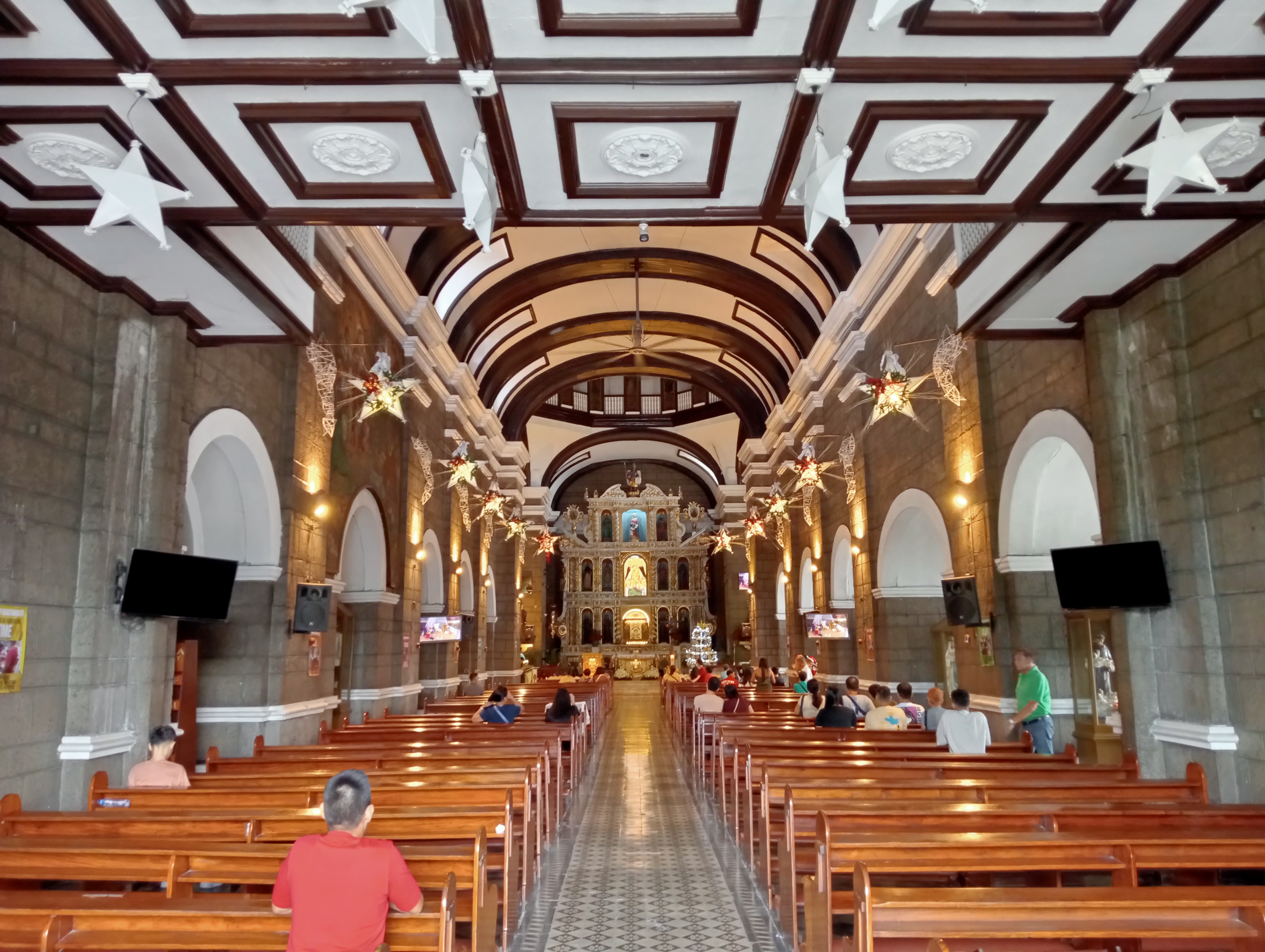
Church interior in 2023

The church structure follows the Baroque architectural style, utilizing adobe blocks in its wall surface finish to give an impression of massiveness. Its floor plan formed the shape of a Latin cross oriented in north–south direction, with the main entrance facing north. The church facade is divided into three levels by heavily molded string courses. The topmost level or the pediment is adorned with Vitruvian-scroll design on its raking cornice, and a central niche flanked with octagonal windows. The second level is composed of semicircular arched windows covered with stained glass. The lowermost level is the main entrance flanked with two niches containing the statues of Anne and Joachim, the parents of the Mary. The ornamentation is mostly found in the frames of lateral niches and the moldings in the cornices and the apertures. Attached to the right side of the structure next to the church facade is the four-floored octagonal bell tower, also made of adobe blocks and were embellished by heavy string courses and other ornamentation.

== Notable features and components ==
=== Baptistery ===
The baptistery or bautisterio is located at the base of the bell tower on the right side of the vestibule or entrance hall. Inside the small room contains the marble baptismal font and a Neoclassical retablo featuring the painting of the Baptism of Christ, framed by two Corinthian columns on each side. Conservation efforts on the Santa Ana church revealed that two paintings have actually adorned the retablo of the baptistery. The first painting one was done on wood, which depicted John the Baptist pouring water on Jesus Christ, the Holy Spirit (symbolized by the dove) together with cherubs above them, and two angels holding a red cloak to cover Jesus. The wooden painting was later covered with the painting on metal, which most likely dated around 1938. The second painting has much simpler depiction, composing of only St. John the Baptist, Jesus Christ and the Holy Spirit above them.

=== Retablo ===
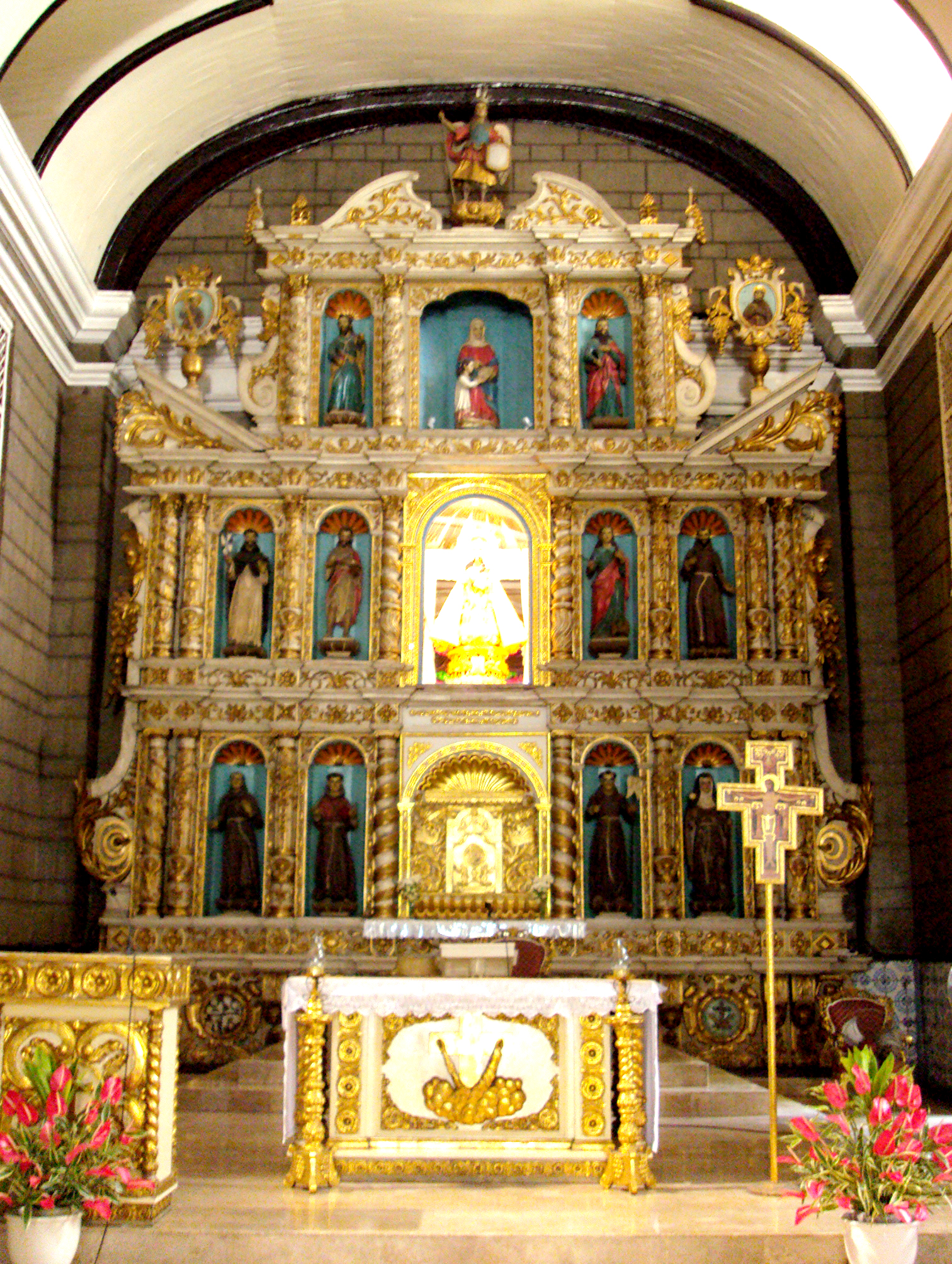
The retablo of the church

The main altarpiece or the retablo is in churrigueresque style, characterized by heavy ornamentation, which is further highlighted by gold leaf on its details. It has thirteen niches, framed with solomonic and churrigueresque columns. The tabernacle or sagrario occupies the lowermost central niche and is flanked by Franciscan saints, namely Bonaventure, Peter of Alcántara, Bernardino of Siena and Clare of Assisi. The central niche of the second or main level contains the image of Our Lady of the Abandoned, flanked by those of Dominic and Francis of Assisi, founders of Catholic religious orders, and the Biblical figures John the Baptist and John the Evangelist. The upper level niches contained the images of Anne, mother of Mary (namesake of the Santa Ana district), at the center with Peter and Paul to the sides. At the top the retablo is an image of Michael the Archangel, which is flanked by painted medallions of Didacus of Alcalá and Paschal Baylon.

=== Dome interior ===
The interior of the dome located above the crossing has two layers of balconies. Sixteen paintings depicting Jesus, the Twelve Apostles (with Matthias replacing Judas Iscariot), the Four Evangelists; Mark and Luke, and John decorate the first level balcony.

=== Camarín de la Virgen ===
The Camarín de la Virgen (Dressing Room of the Virgin) is a small chapel located behind the niche of Our Lady of the Abandoned on the second tier of the retablo. It was built around the same period as the church (c. 1720–1725) and has retained most of its original features. One can view the nave of the church from the octagonal vaulted niche (hornacina) where the image stands. Its high-arched opening is crowned with a large, silver corona imperial (imperial crown). Below the hornacina is a semicircular gilded platform, which is said to be a part of the galleon that brought the image from Valencia all the way to Manila, the Santo Cristo de Burgos. Wooden steps flank the platform, and are used by devotees to climb and venerate the image. At present, only the Virgin's long cape can be touched or kissed.

Of note in this structure are the paintings on the ceiling and on the entrance, which are believed to be as old as the Camarín and the church itself. These paintings belonged to the short-lived Estampita Age of Filipino-Spanish art. The entrance paintings depict life-size images of the archangels Michael and Gabriel guarding the door, also painted with a heavenly scene surrounding the Auspice Maria (a monogram of the letters "A" and "M") for the term "Under the guidance of Mary" and with the folk meanings of Ave Maria as well as the Holy Name of Mary. The ceiling shows Heaven in the center surrounded by eleven segments, with scenes from the lives of Mary and Jesus, from Mary's Betrothal to Joseph to the Baptism of Christ. The central panel shows the Holy Trinity and the kneeling Virgin Mary, with cherubim and angels on both sides.

Inside the Camarín de la Virgen

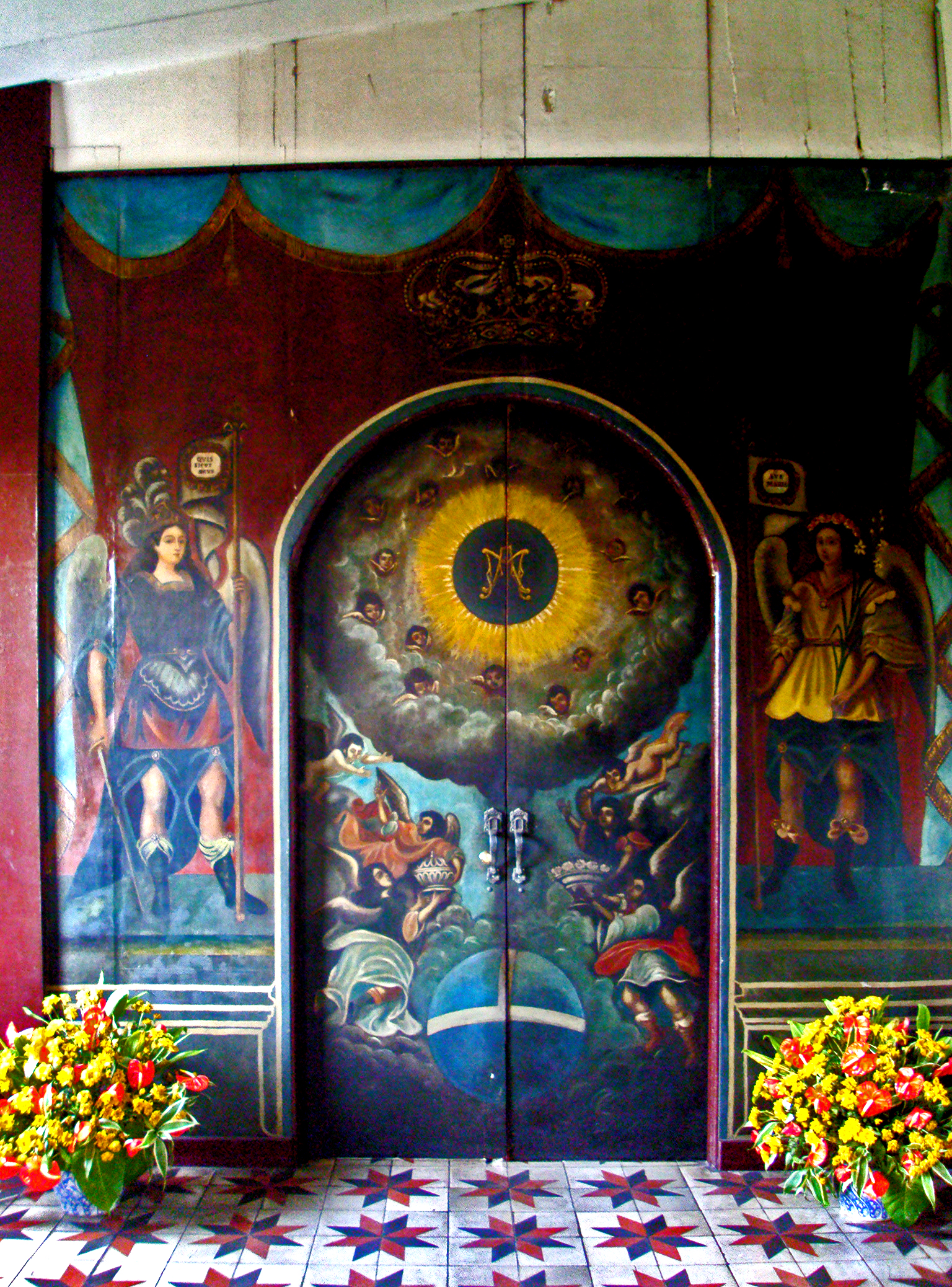

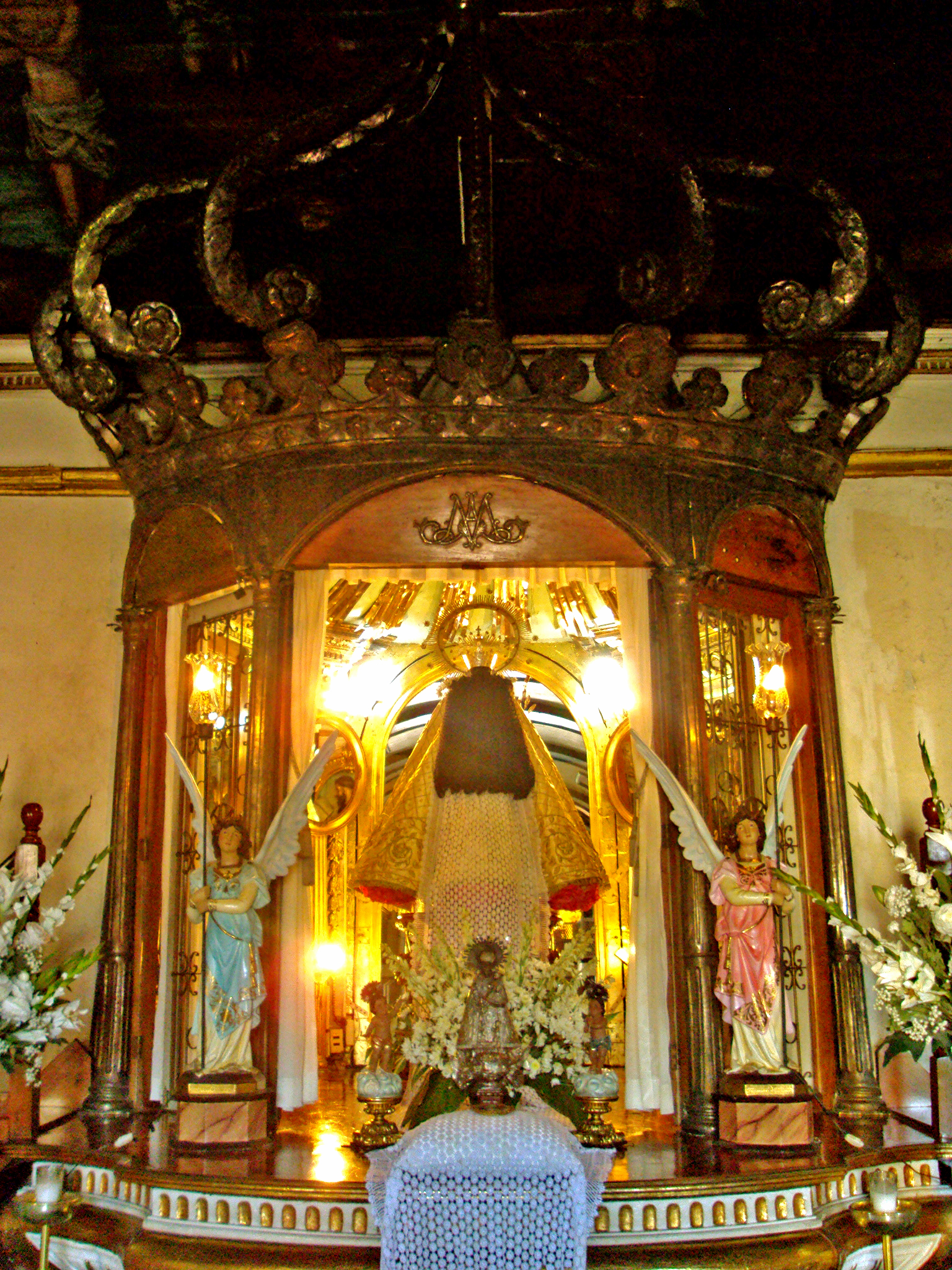

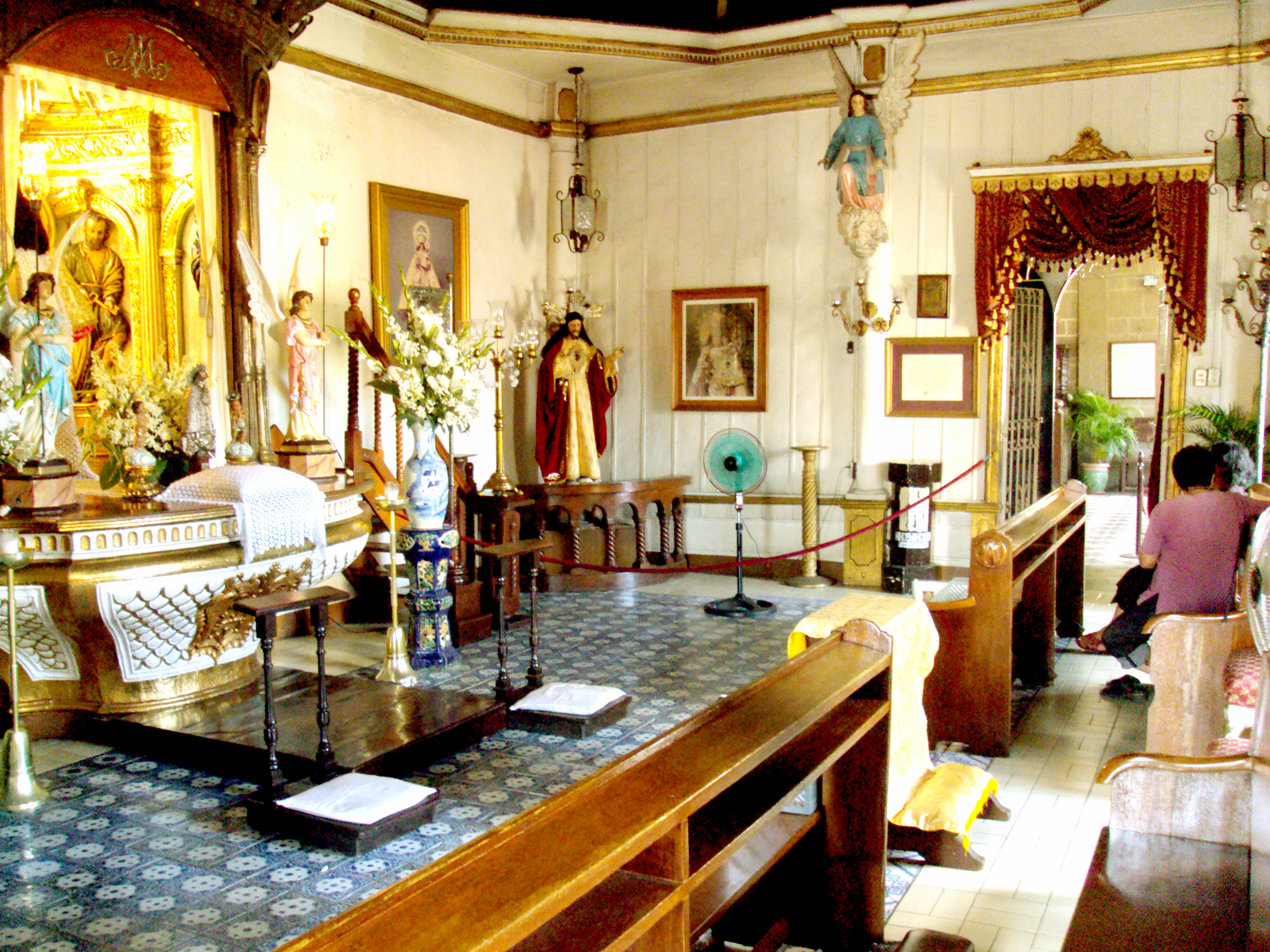

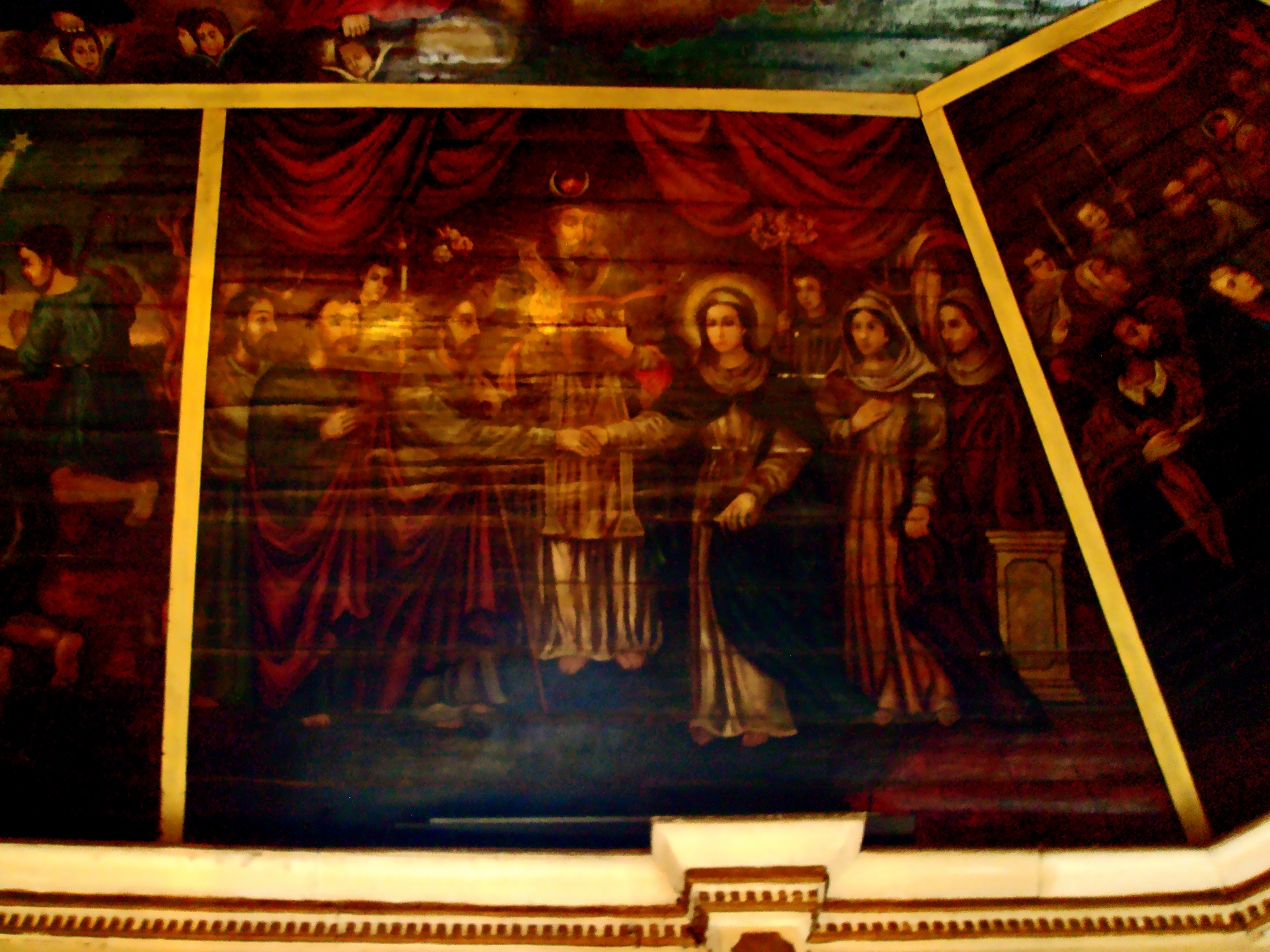

Due to the considerably good preservation of the structure as well as the irreplaceable value of its paintings, which are considered the oldest datable of its kind, the Camarín de la Virgen was declared a National Cultural Treasure in November 2008 by the National Museum of the Philippines.

=== Pozo de la Virgen ===
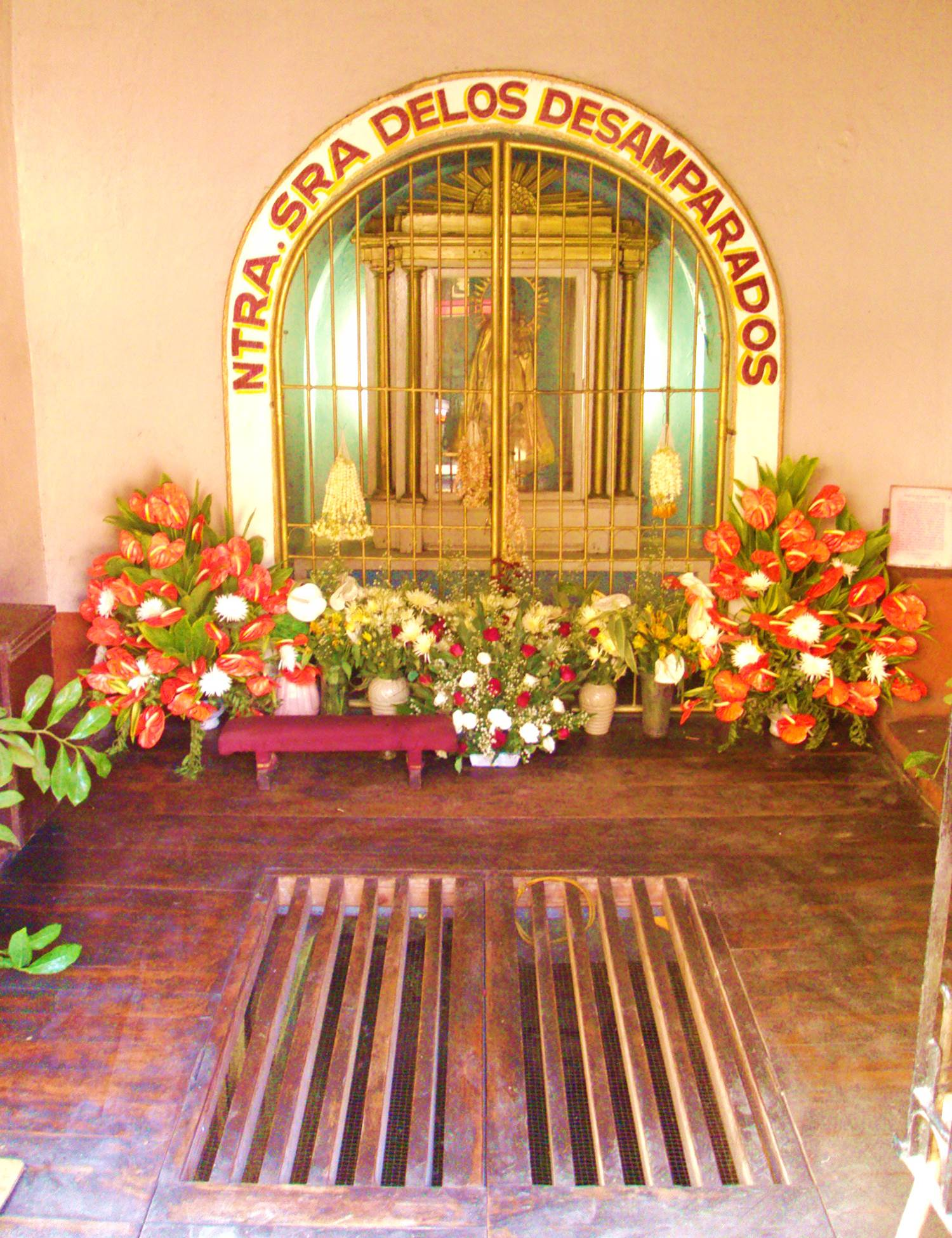
Interior of the Capillita de la Virgen del Pozo

Located behind the Santa Ana Church is the Capillita de la Virgen del Pozo (Small Chapel of the Virgin of the Well). Better known as the Pozo de la Virgen (Well of the Virgin), it housed a holy well of springwater believed to contain healing properties. The exact date of its construction is unknown, although it was generally assumed to have been built around the 18th century, around the same period as the church. The Pozo de la Virgen also enshrines an 18th-century wood and ivory relief image of Our Lady of the Abandoned, placed in a low niche in a position suggesting her guarding the holy well. A wooden trapdoor, which occupies most of the floorspace, opens to reveal the passage to the well. There are ten stone steps that lead to the actual water level, which was contained within a small stone-and-concrete arched chamber.

During the typhoid epidemic of 1920, the well was closed due to sanitary concerns. During the 1977–85 renovations, it was cemented over and decorated with broken tiles from the Camarín de la Virgen. In 2011, the Pozo de la Virgen was reopened after 92 years of being hidden from the public.

=== Convent and patio ===
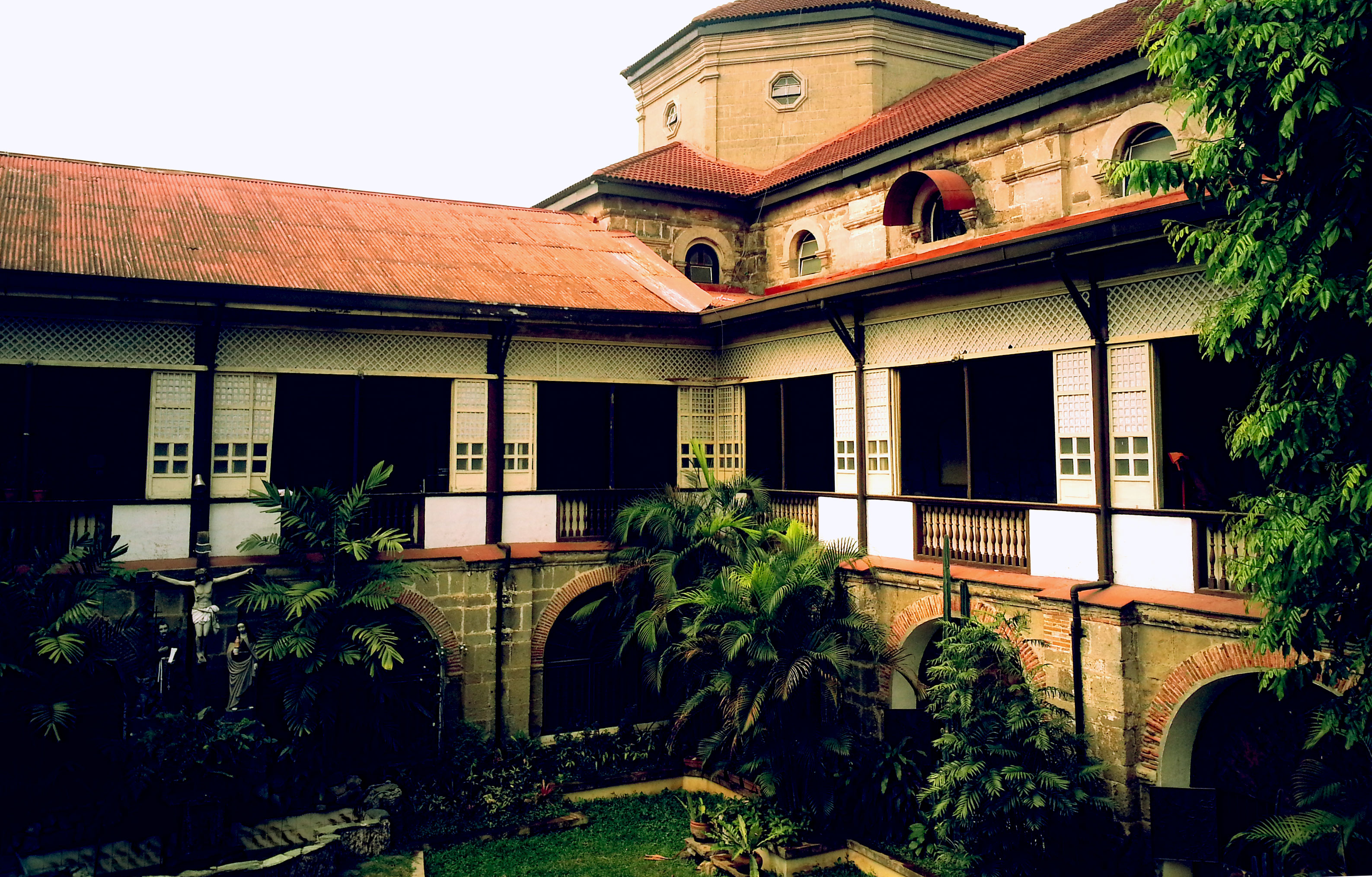
Santa Ana Church Convent

Adjoining the Santa Ana church is the convent, which was also built on the same period as the church under the direction of Vicente Inglés. The ground floor is a stone and clay tile cloister surrounding the grassy patio. Above the cloister is a wooden corridor with capiz and glass windows and high doors leading to the priest's quarters, the choir loft and a room previously used as a library. In 1966, archaeological excavations have been conducted by the National Museum of the Philippines on the patio and the churchyard, uncovering 71 human burials dating around late 11th to 14th centuries from the associated Chinese ceramics recovered with the graves. The bulk of data gathered regarding the pre-Hispanic culture of Santa Ana (the ancient Kingdom of Namayan) led to the construction of a site museum in the patio, which was later declared as a National Cultural Treasure in August 1973 by the virtue of Presidential Decree No. 260.

== Historical and cultural declarations ==
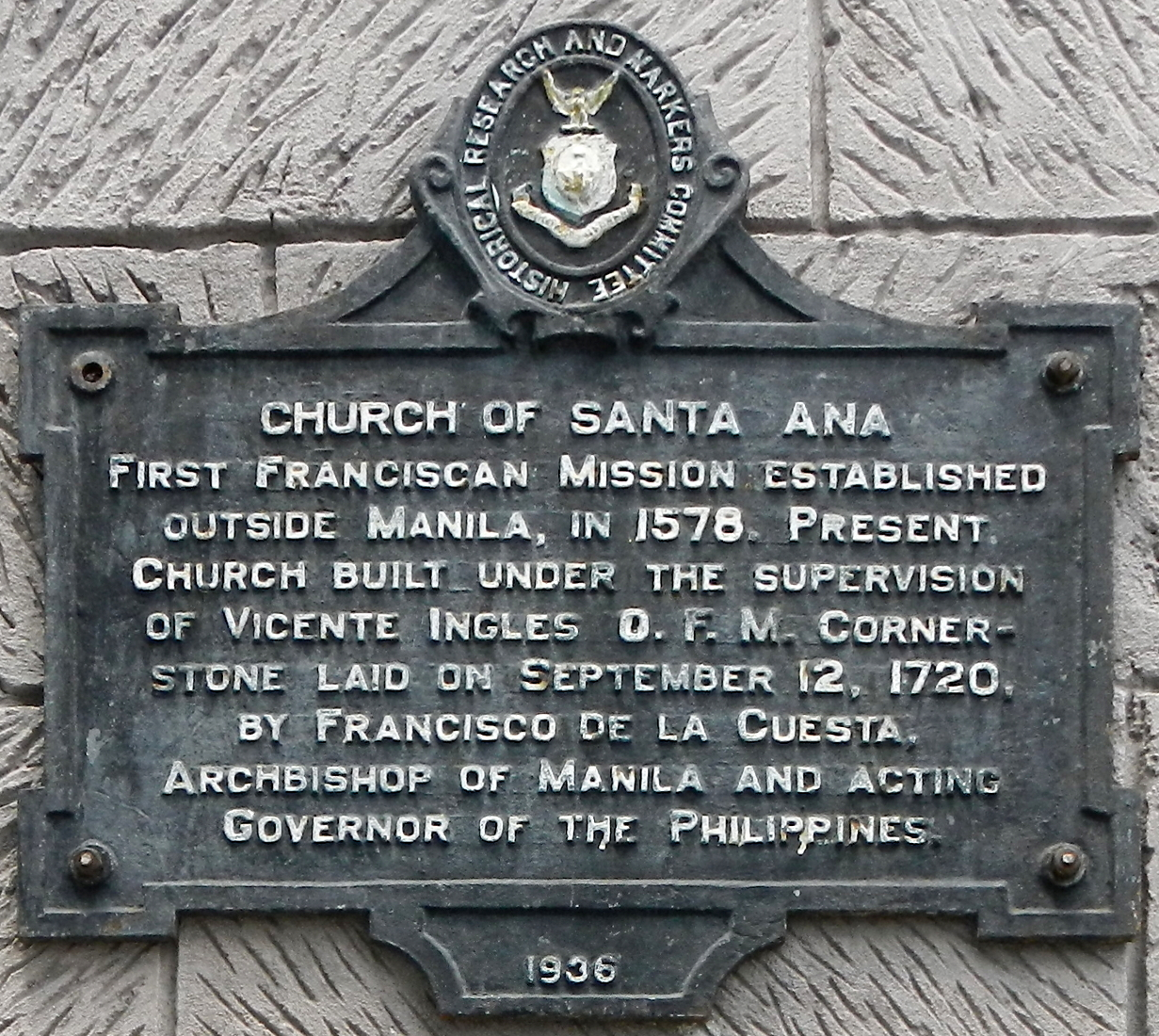
Church HRMC historical marker installed in 1936

The Santa Ana Church has been designated by the National Historical Commission of the Philippines (then the Philippine Historical Research and Markers Committee) as a Historic Building in 1936 with a historical marker for being the first Franciscan mission established outside Manila. The Santa Ana Site Museum located in the convent patio and the Camarín de la Virgen was declared as a National Cultural Treasure in August 1973.
