= Virgen de los Desamparados =

Invocation of the Virgin Mary, patroness of Valencia

Our Lady of the Abandoned
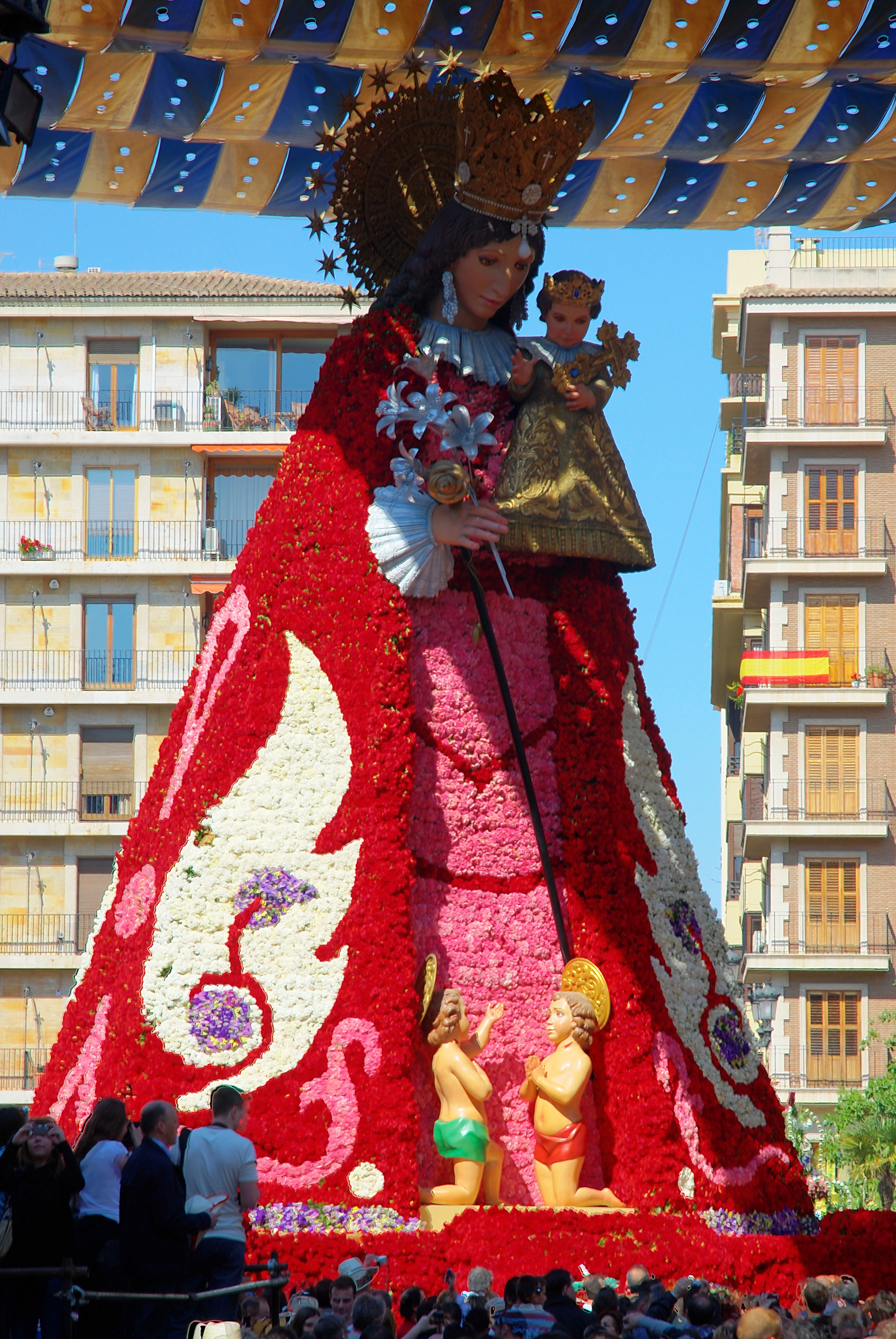
- Image of Our Lady of the Forsaken at the offering of the flowers in Valencia during Fallas, the Valencia Festival of St Joseph. (March 2008).
- Location: Valencia
- Date: Second Sunday of May
- Witness: Saint Amparo, Desamparados
- Shrine: Basilica of Our Lady of the Forsaken, Valencia, Spain
- Patronage: Valencia, Santa Ana, Manila, Marikina, Muntinlupa
- Attributes: A lily in one hand; in the other, the baby Jesus carrying the Cross in his arms; the Geperudeta (hunchback)

Our Lady of the Forsaken (Spanish: Virgen de los Desamparados or Nuestra Señora de los Desamparados; Catalan: Mare de Déu dels Desamparats, IPA: [ˈmaɾe ðe ˈðew ðelz ðezampaˈɾats]; Tagalog: Ina ng mga Walang Mag-Ampon) is a Catholic invocation of the Virgin Mary. She is the patroness of Valencia and one of seven patrons of the Autonomous communities of Spain. She appears with a lily in one hand and in the other, she carries the baby Jesus who bears the cross in his arms. Her posture is characterized by a slight forward tilt, and hence, she is known affectionately as the Geperudeta (hunchback) of València. Her image is housed in the 'Basilica de la Mare de Déu dels Desamparats'.

== Origin ==
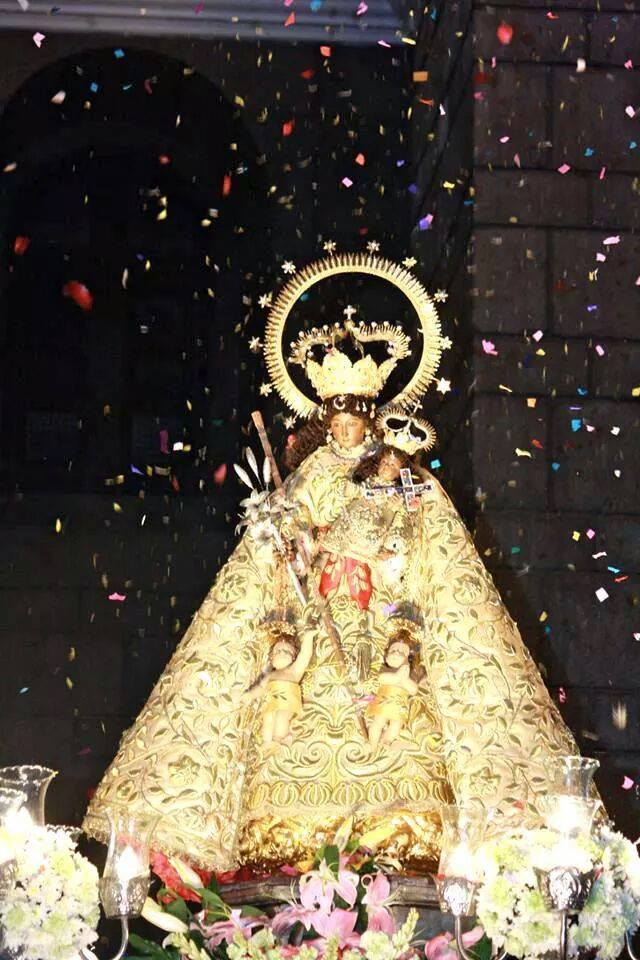
300 year-old image of Nuestra Señora de los Desamparados de Manila, enshrined at Santa Ana Church in Manila, the Philippines. This image was made in Valencia in 1713 and after being touched to the original image of the Virgin enshrined in the basilica, arrived in the Philippines in 1717.

Legend tells, on 24 February 1409, a Friday at the beginning of Lent, a Mercedarian friar named Joan Gilabert Jofré, was on his way from the priory on Mercy Square to St. Catherine's (Santa Catalina) Church in Valencia to deliver a sermon. On the way, on Silverworks Street, (now Martin Mengod Street) he witnessed the lynching of a mentally ill man and intervened to save the man. In response to this event, he preached on the subject of care of the mentally ill and established a hospice for the mentally ill. A manuscript of Manuel Calvo dated 22 December 1848, reads:

"En la present ciutat ha molta obra pia é de gran caritat é sustentació: emperò una n’hi manca, que’s de gran necessitat, so es un hospital o casa on los pobres innocents é furiosos fossen acollits car molts pobres, innocents e furiosos van per aquesta ciutat, los cual passen gran desayres de fam e de fret e injuries, per tal como sa innocènsia i furor no saben guanyar ni demanar lo que han menester en sustentació de llur vida, e perço dormen per les carreres e perijen de fam e de fret, e moltes malvades persones no havent Deu devant sa consciència; los fan moltes injuries e senyaladament allà aon les troben endormits, los nafren i maten y algunes fembres innocents; aconteix així mateix que los pobres furiosos fan dany a mòltes persones anant per la ciutat. Aquestes coses son noties a tota la ciutat de València, perquè serià sancta cosa é obra molt sancta que en la ciutat de València fos feta una habitació ó hospital en què semblants folls é innocents estiguessin en tal manera que no anassen per la ciutat ni poguessin fer dany ni els en fos fet".

Translated, the passage reads:

"In this city, one finds many very important pious and charitable works; however, there is one great need, and that is a hospital or a house where the innocent, the poor and the mad can be cared for. There are many such people wandering this city, suffering from cold and hunger because they cannot earn a living or ask for help. They sleep on the streets, starving and cold. Many wicked people, who do not have God in their hearts insult them, point at them when they are asleep, injure and kill them and rape innocent women. It also happens that some of those who are mad attack citizens on the streets. Everyone in Valencia knows this. It would be a very good thing, a very Holy work if Valencia were to build a house or a hospital where the innocent poor and the mad could be housed so that they would not be on the streets being hurt nor making trouble."

Ten people responded by building the hospital they called El Hospital de Los Locos and on 1 June 1410, Sancta Maria officially opened the Hospital d'Innocents, Follcs i Orats under the protection of the 'Virgin, dels Innocents', known by the people as 'Holy Nostra Dona Maria dels Innocents'.

== The Brotherhood ==
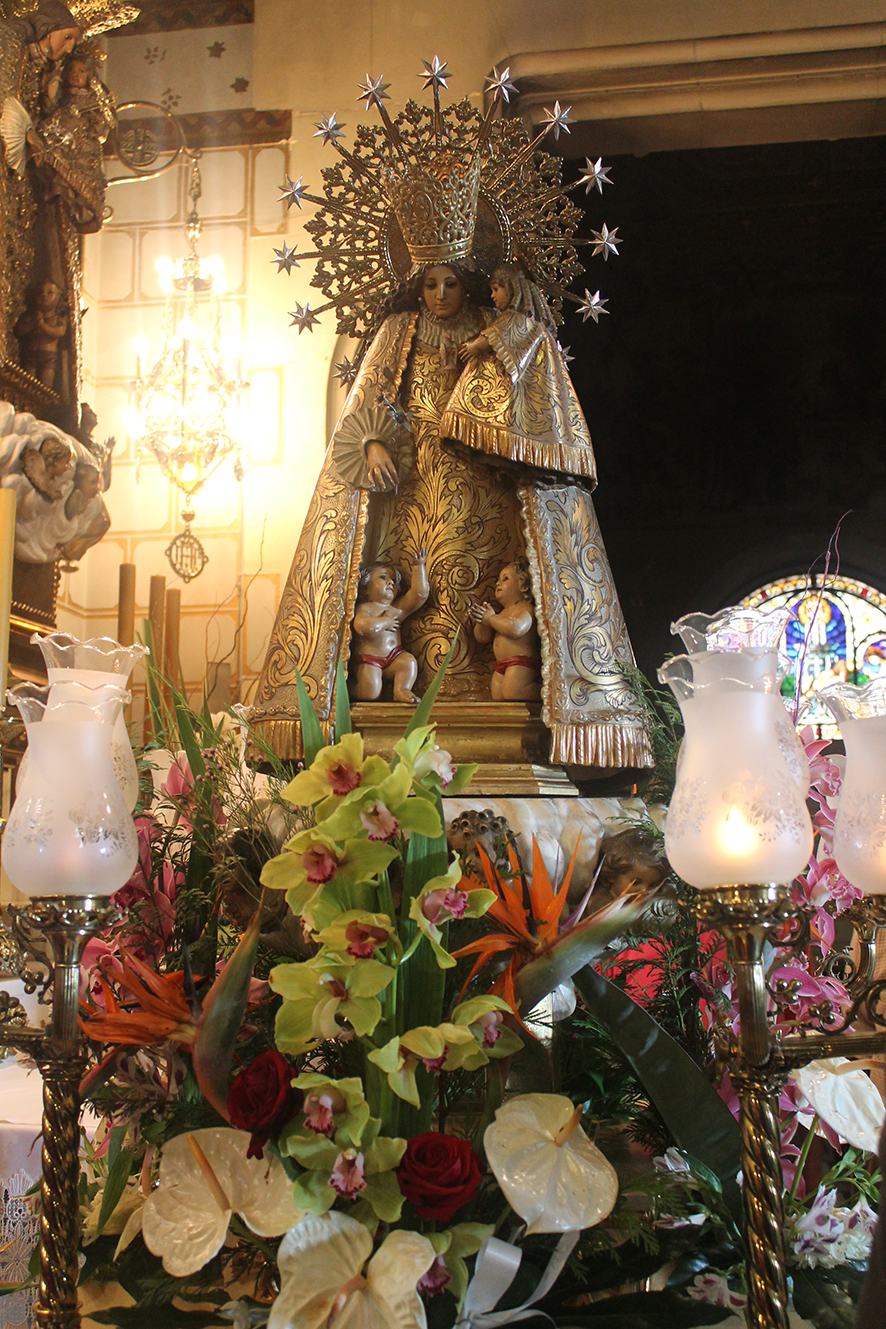
Image of Our Lady of Forsaken in the Royal Sanctuary of San Jose of the Mountain in Barcelona.

On 29 August 1414, a brotherhood was founded under the invocation of 'Sancta dels Folls Dona Nostra i Desamparats Innocents' (Our Lady of the Insane and the Forsaken Innocents). Initially, the goal of the brotherhood was to help the mentally ill. However, due to famine and a high numbers of orphans left by the plague, there were many bereft children on the streets of Valencia and so, the brotherhood extended its care to homeless and abandoned children. Two years later, in keeping with this, the patroness was renamed 'Our Lady of the Forsaken'. In addition to raising funds for the hospital, the Brothers also saw to the burial rites of the dead including hospital patients, shipwrecked sailors and prostitutes. In the Iberian Peninsula and Latin-American Spanish speaking countries, the model of the 'Hospital de los Innocentes' was a forerunner in care of the mentally ill.

== The miracle of the angels ==
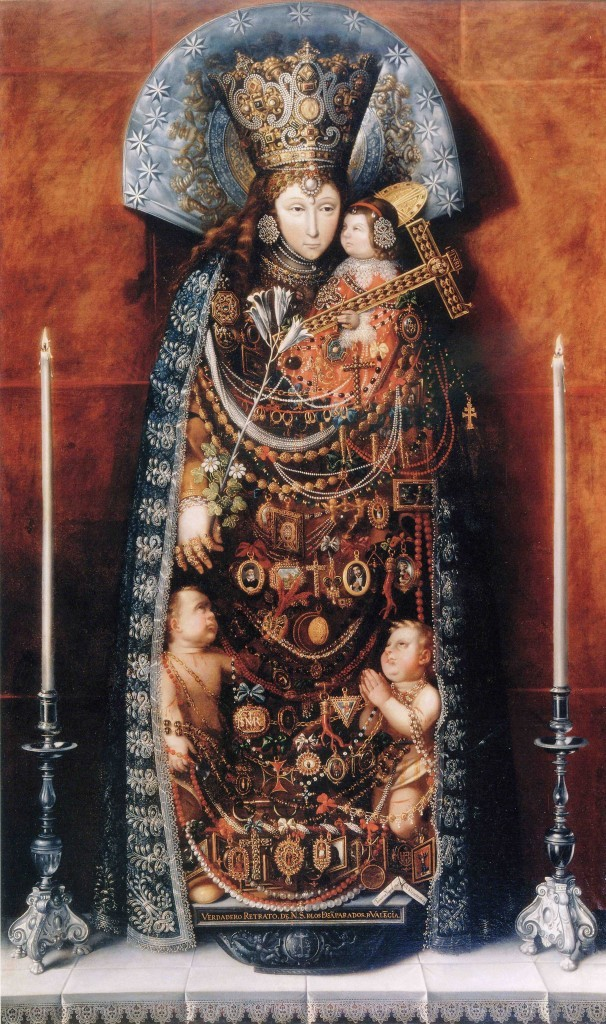
Virgin of the Forsaken (1644) by Tomás Yepes, a Valancian artist.

Jofré and the brothers constructed an oratory (capitulet) in the hospital to house an image of 'our Lady of the Forsaken'. According to legend, three young men dressed as pilgrims arrived and offered to make an image of the Virgin within three days in exchange for their board. They were taken to a place known as "The Hermitage". After four days and without any sound emanating from within, the brothers forced the door and found the image of the Virgin Mary. The mysterious pilgrims had disappeared. Shortly after, a paralyzed and blind woman, who was the wife of one of the Brothers, was cured. The incident gave rise to the legend of "El feren els àngels" ("Made by the angels").

== Basilica de la Virgen de los Desamparados ==
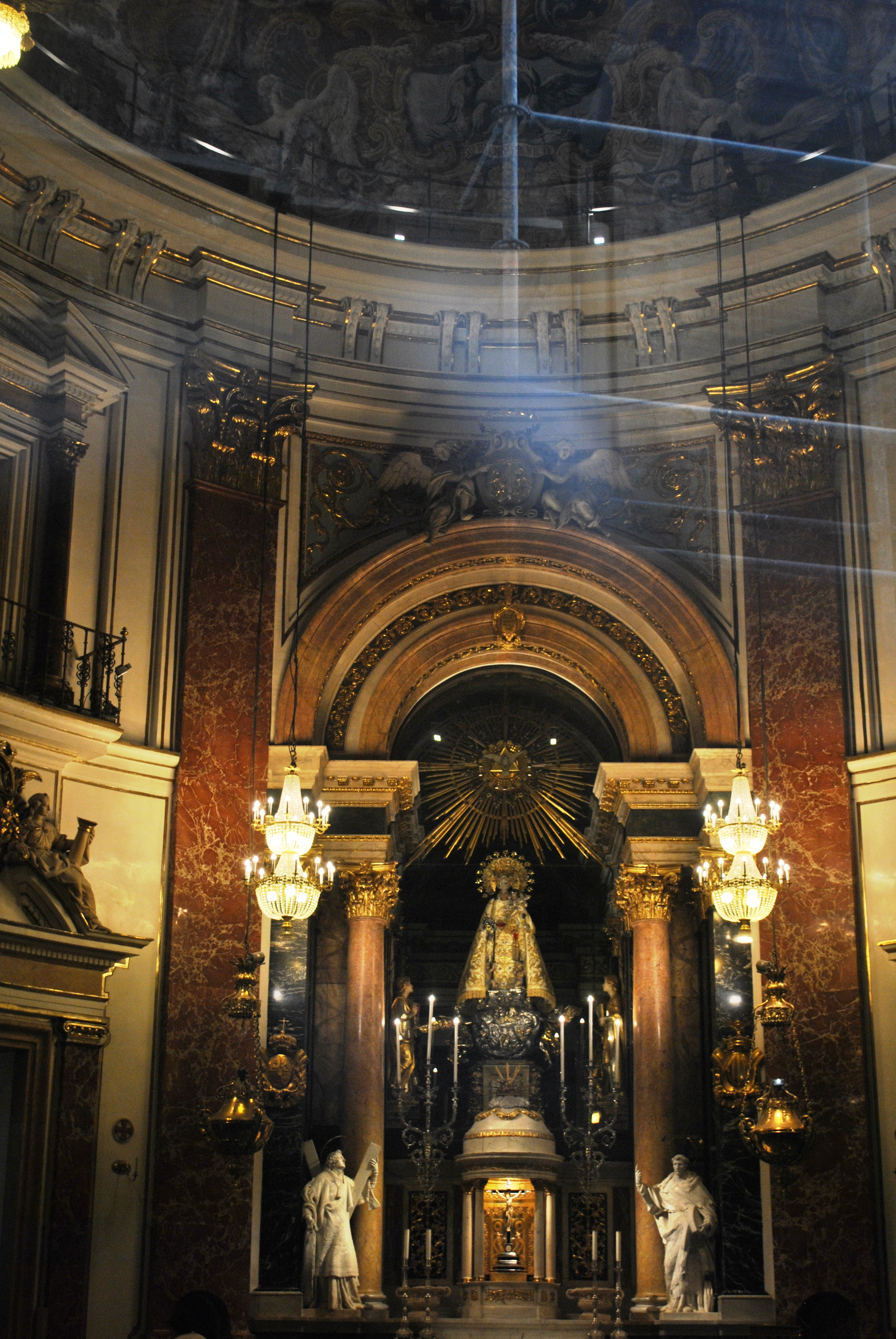
Basilica de la Virgen de los Desamparados

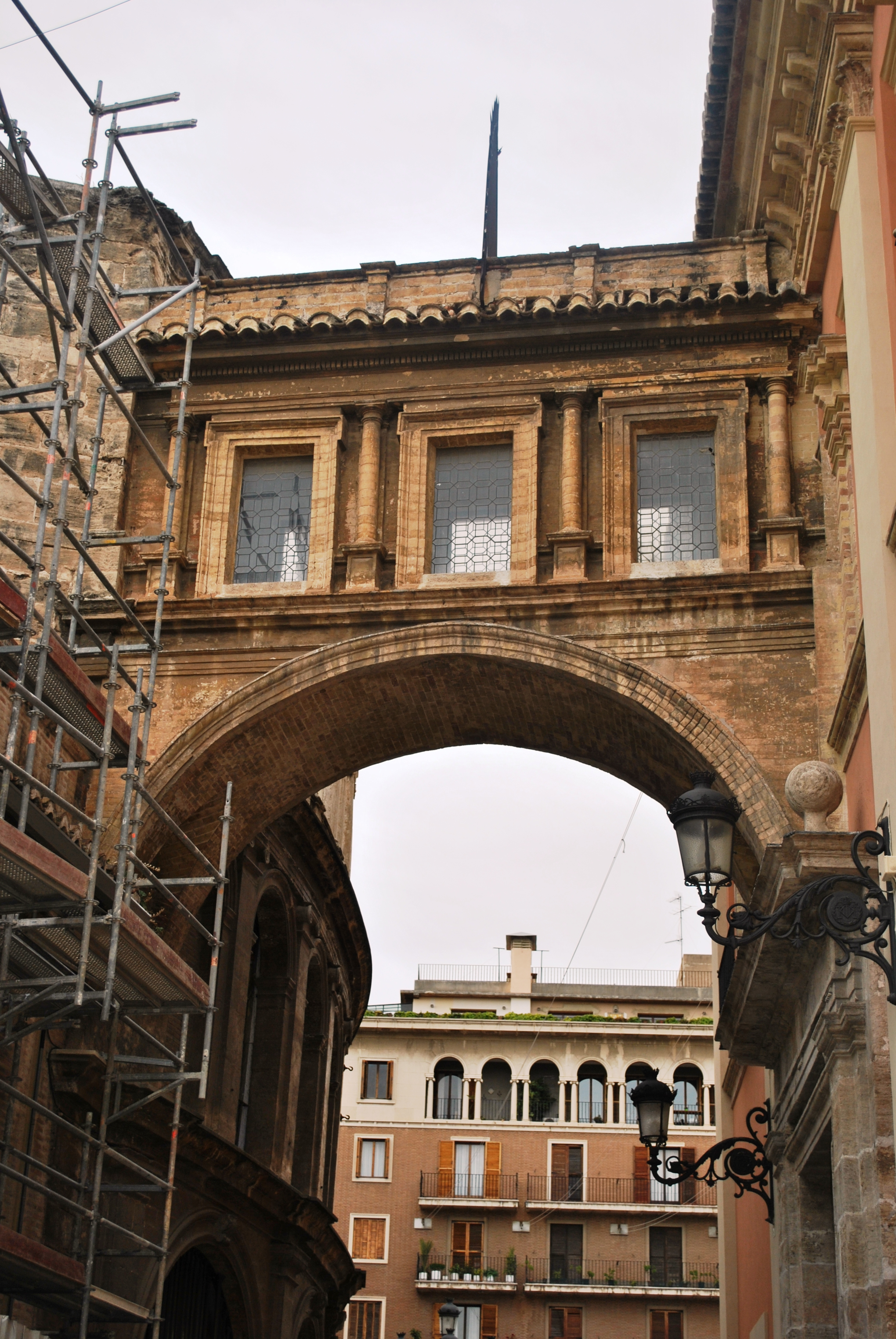
Renaissance arch to the Basilica de la Virgen de los Desamparados

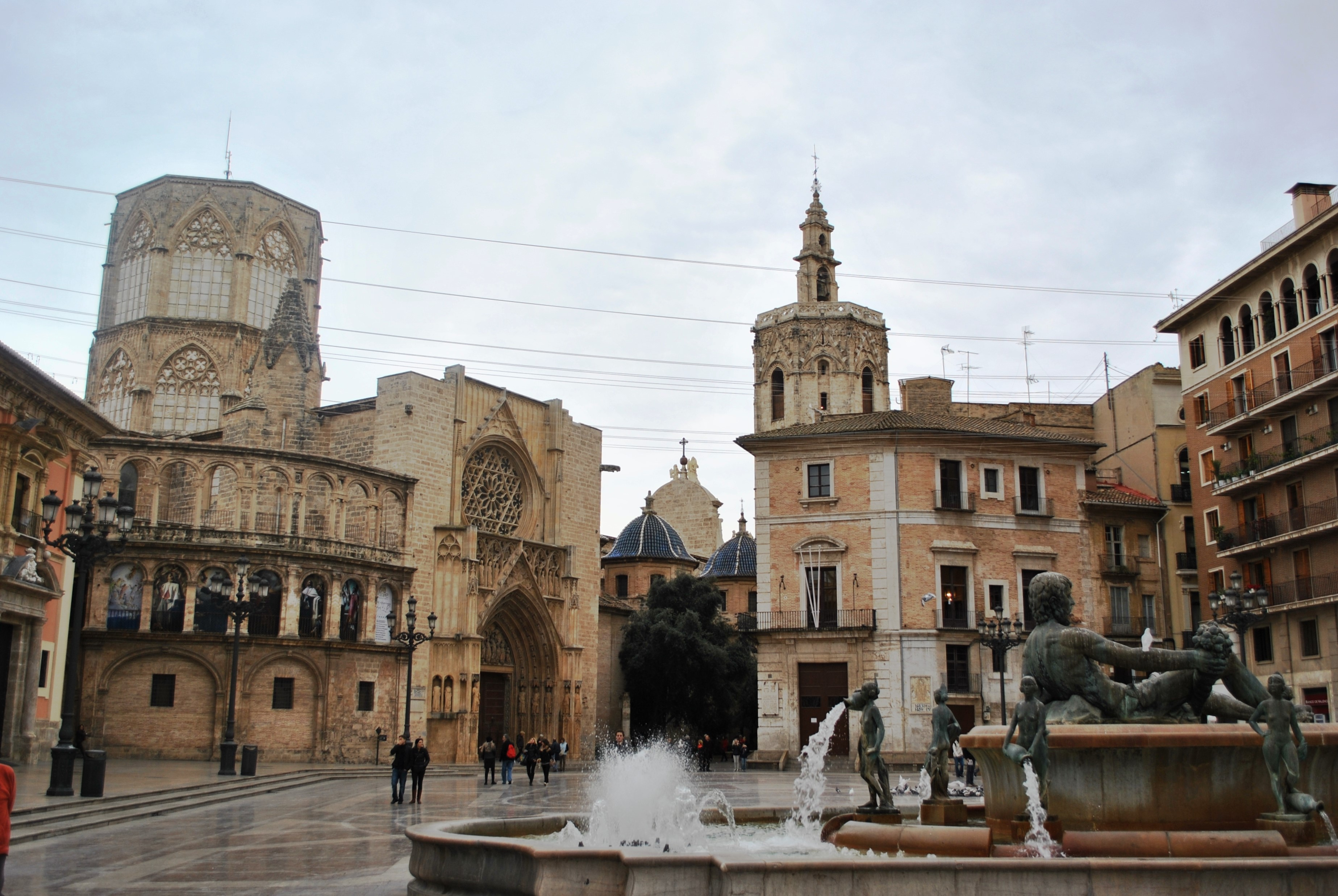
Plaza de la Virgen de los Desamparados

The basilica which now houses the image of 'Our Lady' was built on the site of a Roman temple. A renaissance arch leads from the basilica on Plaza de la Virgen to Valencia cathedral. Inside the basilica there is a Gothic style statue of The Virgin with two children at her feet. A mechanical device allows the statue to revolve. Antonio Palomino (1653 - 1726) painted the frescoes on the dome of the nave.

== Folds of the tunic ==
In 1416 King Alfonso V, the Magnanimous stated:

"The image is constructed such that two of those innocent ones sacrificed for Herod could be concealed within the folds of her tunic."

The image became known as Mare de Déu dels Folls, Innocents i Desemparats. The image was venerated at the hospital oratory until 1487 when it was moved to St Catherine's Cathedral.

== Decree of 1493 ==
The Brother's works increased to caring for many disadvantaged people such as foundlings, orphans and prisoners, and so, a second hospital was built. In 1493, Fernando added to the dedication of 'Our Lady of the innocent' that of 'the helpless'.

== General hospital ==
In 1512, the leaders of the city combined all the city's charitable works into one general hospital. However, in 1545, the General Hospital of Valencia was destroyed by a fire in which 30 patients perished. A new hospital, the Hospital of Saragossa, was built with a specialised area for the care of children. On 20 June 1849, it was renamed the 'Provincial Hospital'. On 21 April 1885 Pope Leo XIII granted a Papal bull naming the 'Virgin of the Forsaken' the patroness of Valencia. Since then, those faithful to the 'Virgin of the Forsaken' have helped children, the elderly, the blind, and the mentally ill.

== Festival of Our Lady ==
The feast of 'Our Virgin of the Forsaken' is held on the second Sunday of May when Valencians pay tribute to their patron. Late, on the eve of the festival, at the 'Plaza de La Virgen', the Valencia municipal band performs, followed by fireworks over the Towers of Serrano, and folk dancing. Early, on the Sunday morning, there is an open-air mass (la misa descubierta).

=== Traslado ===
The highlight of the festival takes place on Sunday mid-morning when the image is carried from her basilica, (Basilica de la Virgen de los Desamparados) on 'Plaza de la Virgen' to St Catherine's cathedral over a distance of approximately 200 m. She is adored with rose petals being thrown down from balconies and people crying and shaking with the emotion of the spectacle.

=== Mascletà ===
On Sunday afternoon, when the Traslado is completed, there is a loud daytime fireworks display, (the Mascletà, a series of firecrackers going off one after the other).

=== Procession ===
Sunday evening features a more solemn procession of ladies dressed in black, men in suits, city officials and the bishop of Valencia followed by 'Our Lady'. The route includes: Plaza de la Virgen, Caballeros, Plaça del Tossal, Bolsería, Mercado, María Cristina, San Vicente, Pl. Reina, Mar, Avellanas, Palau and Almoina.

=== Ronda a la Verge ===
The festival ends on the Monday evening when traditional music is played in the 'Plaza de La Virgen'.

== Psychiatric hospitals of Iberia in the 15th and 16th centuries ==
- Hospital de Innocentes de Valencia (1409) - founded by Joan Gilabert Jofré
- Hospital de la Santa Cruz de Barcelona (1412) - psychiatric care from 1438
- Hospital de Nuestra Señora de Gracia de Zaragoza (1425) - founded by Alfonso V of Aragon
- Hospital de los Innocentes de Sevilla (1436)
- Palma de Mallorca (1456)
- Hospital de los Innocentes El nuncio apostólico (1483)
- Hospital de Valladolid (1489)
- Hospital Real de Granada (1527)
- Hospital de Madrid Fundado por Felipe II (1566)
- San Hipólito-México Fundado por fray Bernardino Álvarez (1567)
