= Joan Gilabert Jofré =

Spanish Roman Catholic priest (1364-1417)

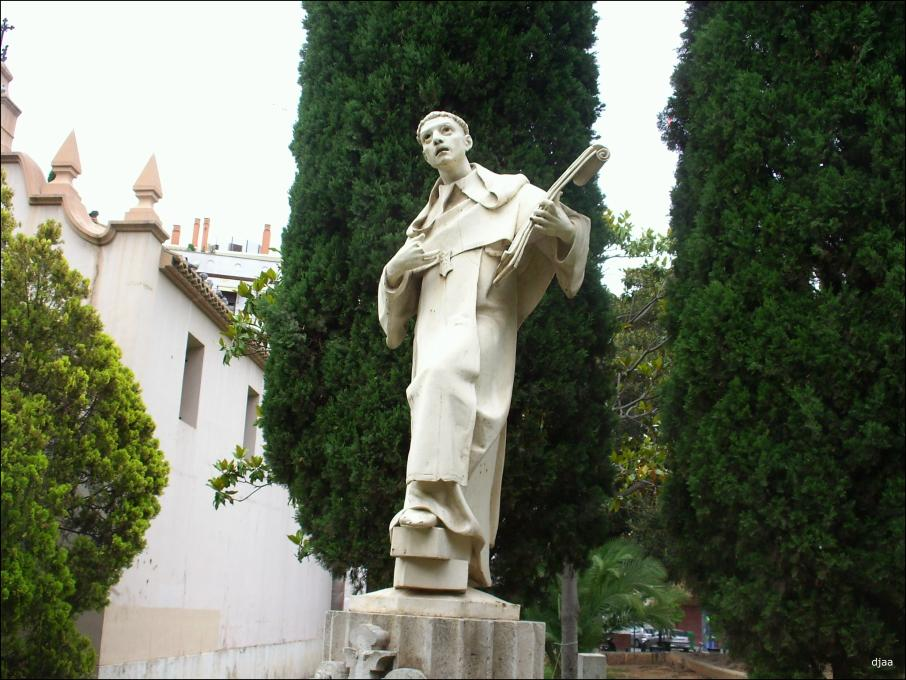
Joan Gilabert Jofré

Joan Gilabert Jofré (1364–1417), also known as Padre Jofré or Pare Jofré, was a member of the Christian religious Order of Mercy and the founder of what is claimed to be the first psychiatric care institution in Europe, in Valencia, Crown of Aragon, in medieval Spain.

Joan Gilabert was born in Valencia on June 23, 1364. Having studied in Lleida, he returned to Valencia where he joined the Order of Mercy in 1370 and entered the Monastery of El Puig. He was ordained priest in 1375 and became a preacher. He eventually became Superior of the Order in Valencia. From 1391 he dedicated himself to the redemption of captives, for which he had royal privileges. A commitment to the poor led him to establish institutions to care for the mentally ill, abandoned children, and indigent pilgrims. After his death, he became a subject of religious veneration and he has been proposed for canonization as a saint of the Roman Catholic Church.

== The Order of Mercy ==
The Order of Mercy, founded in 1218, was one of the numerous popular institutions concerned with charitable works and motivated by religious piety that were established throughout Europe during the 12th and 13th centuries. The Order's founder, the Catalan Peter Nolasco, tutor to King James I of Aragón, had fought in the wars of the Christian reconquest of the Iberian Peninsula. The Kingdom of Aragón bordered on al-Andalus (Muslim Spain) and Peter Nolasco was aware of the plight of impoverished Christian captives in Muslim hands. Aristocrats and the wealthy were often able to negotiate and purchase their freedom but ordinary prisoners lacking the funds needed to obtain their release were condemned to indefinite slavery. Peter Nolasco dedicated the Order to the work of ransoming these ordinary captives.

The 1327 Albertine Constitutiones in force at the time Pare Jofré joined the order, established religious worship - the Divine Office - and the redemption of Christian captives as the Order's ends and fundamental principles. The Constitutiones were modeled on the constitutions of the major orders of preaching friars. The friars of the order were required to preach and collect alms for a redemption fund, to be used only for redeeming captives. Initially, the Order's work was carried out in Valencia and the Balearic Islands, because of their proximity, but as the Spanish Reconquista of the Iberian Peninsula proceeded, captives were redeemed from slavery further afield, in Andalusia and North Africa.

Pare Jofré earned a reputation as an effective administrator, a good preacher and a successful redeemer of captives in Spain and North Africa. Even while holding the relatively lowly office of vicar of the Mercedarians' convent in Lérida, he was a sufficiently respected figure by 1391 to be able to appeal to King Juan I for support for his efforts to redeem captives and hostages. While committed to the cause of the poor and abandoned, he was politically astute and in 1409 he was appointed the Order's comendador, or Superior, in Valencia (the start of a fruitful preaching partnership with St Vincent Ferrer, with whom he travelled across Valencia, Aragon, Catalonia, Castile and Portugal.)

== Mission to the troubled and abandoned ==
The contemporary Christian view tended to view the psychologically troubled as possessed by the devil. Pare Jofré's missions to rescue captives in Muslim Spain and North Africa are thought to have given him an insight into the different way the mentally ill were treated in Islamic communities. On 24 February 1409, as he was on his way to the Cathedral in Valencia to preach the homily for the first Sunday of Lent, he saw two young men brutally attacking a madman. After rescuing the injured victim and taking him back to his convent, he returned towards the cathedral and preached a memorable sermon that urged the establishment of a charitable institution to care for and treat the mentally ill and other outcasts. At the end of the sermon a group of 11 Valencians, headed by Llorenç Salom, joined to fund this initiative.

Backed by papal authority (a papal bull of the Antipope Benedict XIII, dated 26 February 1410) and with royal approval from King Martin of Aragon, Pare Jofré proceeded to found what was the world's first hospital for the mentally ill, the Hospital dels Ignoscents or Hospital of the Holy Innocents, also known as the Hospital dels Folls, or Hospital of the Mad, dedicated to the Virgin Mary under the title of "Our Lady of the Innocents". The hospital eventually became what is now the Hospital General Universitario, or University Teaching Hospital, in Valencia.

Pare Jofré's other social works included the founding of a hospice for abandoned children in Valencia in 1410 and the establishment of a hostel for impoverished pilgrims at El Puig in 1416.

== Joan Gilabert's plan expansion throughout Spain ==
Joan's initiative, which provided the mentally ill with medical treatment, albeit precarious, and with a residence where they could live safely, was not an island in an ocean of indifference but rather spread to other parts of Spain, giving continuity to a way of assisting these patients. After the Hospital of Innocents, in Valencia, other hospitals followed and were built in Zaragoza (1425), Seville (1436), Valladolid (1436), Palma de Mallorca (1456), Toledo and Granada (1527), which were commissioned by the Spanish Catholic Monarchs themselves.

All of this made Spain the most advanced country in the treatment of the alienated at the end of the 15th century, as Javier Aztarain Díez, from the University of Navarra, tells in his study 'Psychiatric care prior to the 18th century': «The conversion of the kingdom of Spain into an empire, after the discovery of the American continent, did nothing but reinforce the role of Spain in the development of psychiatric care. The humanitarian way of treating the mentally ill has been recognized internationally as one of the characteristics of the hospitals for the insane founded in Spain in the 15th century”, he recalls.

== Veneration and canonisation ==
Pare Jofré died on 18 May 1417 at the Monastery of El Puig, where his remains are buried. He was venerated after his death and a cult of devotion emerged.

Efforts to secure Pare Jofré's canonization as a saint of the Roman Catholic Church were frustrated in the early 19th century and the 1930s when the supporting documentation was destroyed, on the first occasion by invading Napoleonic forces and on the second in anti-religious disturbances at the start of the Spanish Civil War in 1936. More recently the process was revived and in 2007 after the diocesan stage of the canonization process in Valencia was completed the cause of canonization was referred to the Holy See in Rome.

== Bibliography ==
- Ramajo Aliste, Félix (1998). Vida y obra del padre Juan Gilabert Jofre (in Spanish; "Life and Work of Father Juan Gilabert Jofre"), publ. by Diputación Provincial de Valencia. ISBN 978-84-7795-156-8.
