= Turia (river) =

River in Spain

Turia Guadalaviar
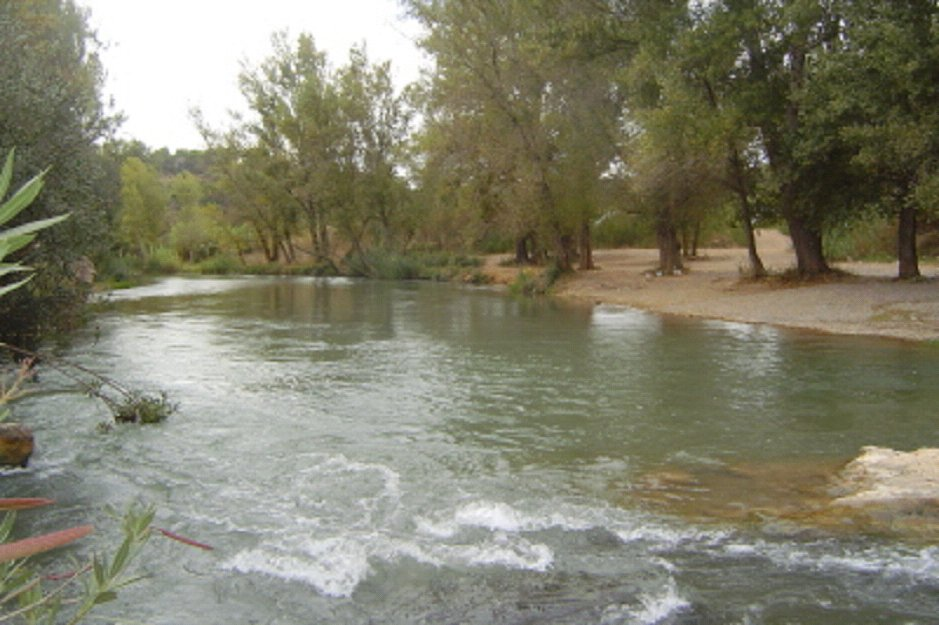
- View of Turia River near Benaguasil
- Etymology: Proto-Celtic *dubr-, 'river'
- Native name: Turia (Spanish); Túria (Valencian)

Location
- Country: Spain
- Region: Aragon; Castilla–La Mancha; Valencian Community
- District: Province of Teruel; Province of Cuenca; Province of Valencia

Physical characteristics
- Source
  - location: Montes Universales, Aragon, Spain
  - elevation: 1,680 m (5,510 ft)
- Mouth
  - location: Mediterranean Sea in Valencia, Province of Valencia, Valencian Community, Spain
  - elevation: 0 m (0 ft)
- Length: 280 km (170 mi)
- Basin size: 6,393.6 km^{2} (2,468.6 sq mi)

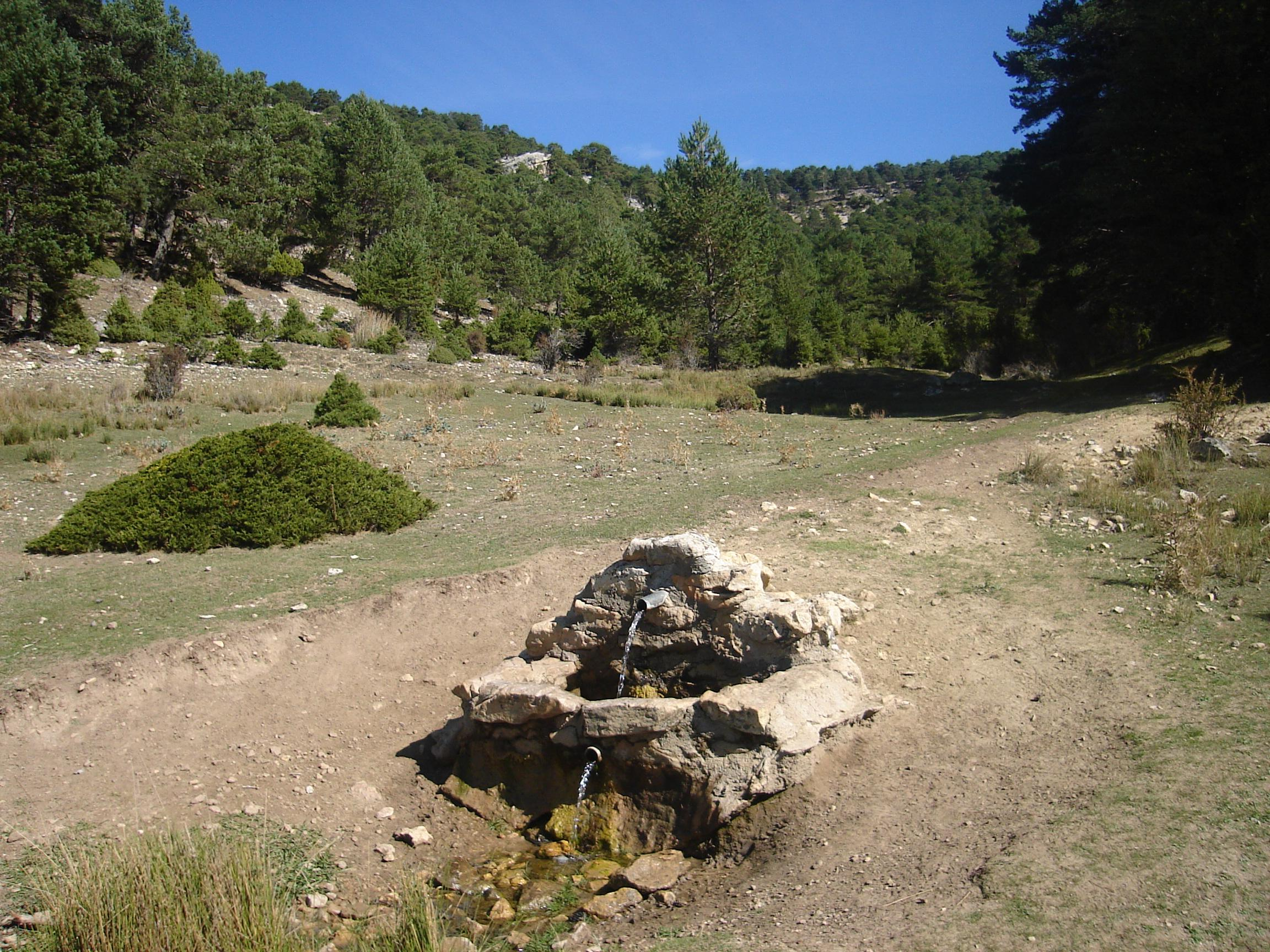
Source of the Turia River, known as Guadalaviar, in the Montes Universales

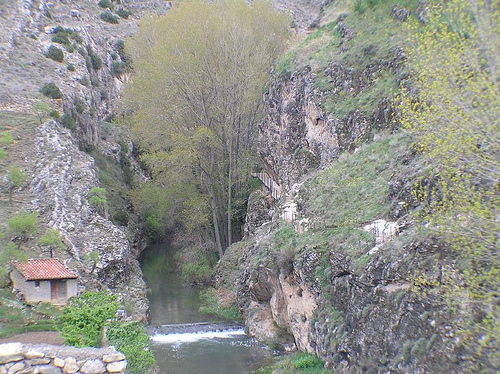
A view of the river as it passes through the Albarracín Mountains

The Turia (Spanish: [ˈtuɾja]) or Túria (Valencian: [ˈtuɾi.a]) (Note: From Latin: Tūria [ˈtuːri.a], from Proto-Celtic *dubr-, 'river'.) is a river in Spain, which has its source in the Montes Universales in the mountain ranges of the northwesternmost end of the Sistema Ibérico, Teruel province. From its source to roughly the city of Teruel, it is called Guadalaviar (Spanish: [ɡwaðalaˈβjaɾ], Valencian: [ɡwaðalaviˈaɾ]). (Note: From Arabic الوادي الأبيض al-wādī l-abyaḍ, 'the white river'.) It runs through the provinces of Teruel, Cuenca and Valencia, and discharges into the Mediterranean Sea near the city of Valencia. The river formerly ran through the center of the city but was diverted south of the city to prevent flooding.

== Name ==
The Latin name Tūria (also recorded as Tyrius) has been connected with the Celtic root *dubr-, 'river'; the river would thus share a root with the Douro. The name Guadalaviar is instead borrowed from Arabic الوادي الأبيض al-wādī l-abyaḍ, 'the white river'.

== Diversion project ==
The river is notorious for its floods. The flood which occurred on 14 October 1957, known as the Great Flood of Valencia, flooded large parts of the city of Valencia, and caused a great deal of damage to both life and property. To prevent this from happening in the future, a diversion project was devised (Pla Sud in Valencian; Plan Sur in Spanish), completed in 1969, and the river was divided in two at the western city limits near Quart de Poblet. During floods, most of the water is diverted southwards along a new course that skirts the city, until it meets the Mediterranean. The old course of the river has been turned into a central green-space for the city, a cultural attraction known as the Garden of the Turia.

Not unlike the Los Angeles River, the man-made diversion channel south of the city is often found dry, since water primarily flows during periods of flooding. Under ordinary flow rates the water is directed through irrigation channels to help cultivate the fertile plain of Valencia. Throughout history the water of the River Turia has been used to irrigate the region. In modern times, a complex network of irrigation has been created, with the main axis centred on the diversion project. Beyond irrigation, these channels also take runoff and surplus water from the Turia to the wetlands and marshes around Valencia.

== Attractions along the old course ==
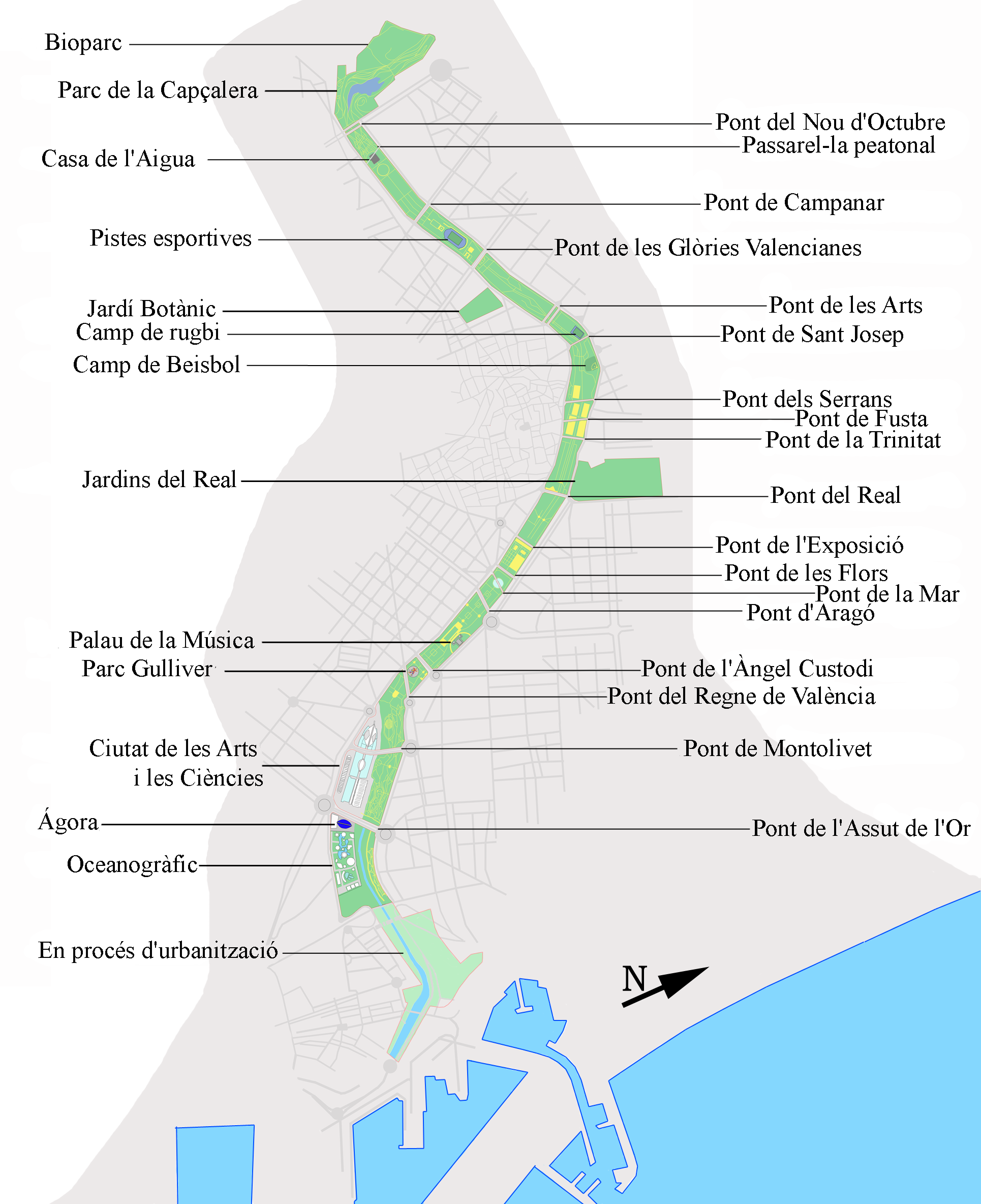
Map of Turia Garden

The old riverbed is now a verdant sunken park that allows cyclists and pedestrians to traverse much of the city without the use of roads. The park, called the 'Garden of the Turia' (Jardí del Túria/Jardín del Turia) boasts numerous ponds, paths, fountains, flowers, football pitches, cafés, artworks, climbing walls, an athletics track, a zen garden and more. The many bridges overhead carry traffic across the park.

External image
- Parc Gulliver at flickr. Playground laid out as a giant Gulliver with visitors as Lilliputians.

Towards the park's eastern end of the river course is the Valencian Music Palace (el Palau de la Música Valenciana). Also towards the eastern end is the Gulliver Park (Parc Gulliver/Parque Gulliver) (39°27′46″N 0°21′33″W), a children's adventure playground featuring a huge fibreglass model of Lemuel Gulliver tied to the ground with ropes. The model is constructed such that the ropes are climbable. In addition, Gulliver's clothes form slides and ladders on which to play.

Marking the park's eastern extreme is Valencia's neo-futuristic architectural and cultural complex, the City of Arts and Sciences, featuring the opera house Palau de les Arts Reina Sofia, an cinemax/panetarium L'Hemisfèric, the science museum Museu de les Ciències Príncipe Felipe, and an oceanographic park L'Oceanogràfic.

Two Metrovalencia stations lie beneath the riverbed, with entrances on either bank: Túria and Alameda.

== See also ==
- List of rivers of Spain
- Rambla del Poyo
