= Alberto Domingo =

Spanish engineer

Alberto Domingo is a Spanish engineer and Doctor of Civil Engineering at the Polytechnic University of Valencia. With his colleague Carlos Lázaro, he has designed and built a number of structures, including Valencia's Oceanographic Park.
