= Turia Garden =

Park in Valencia, Spain

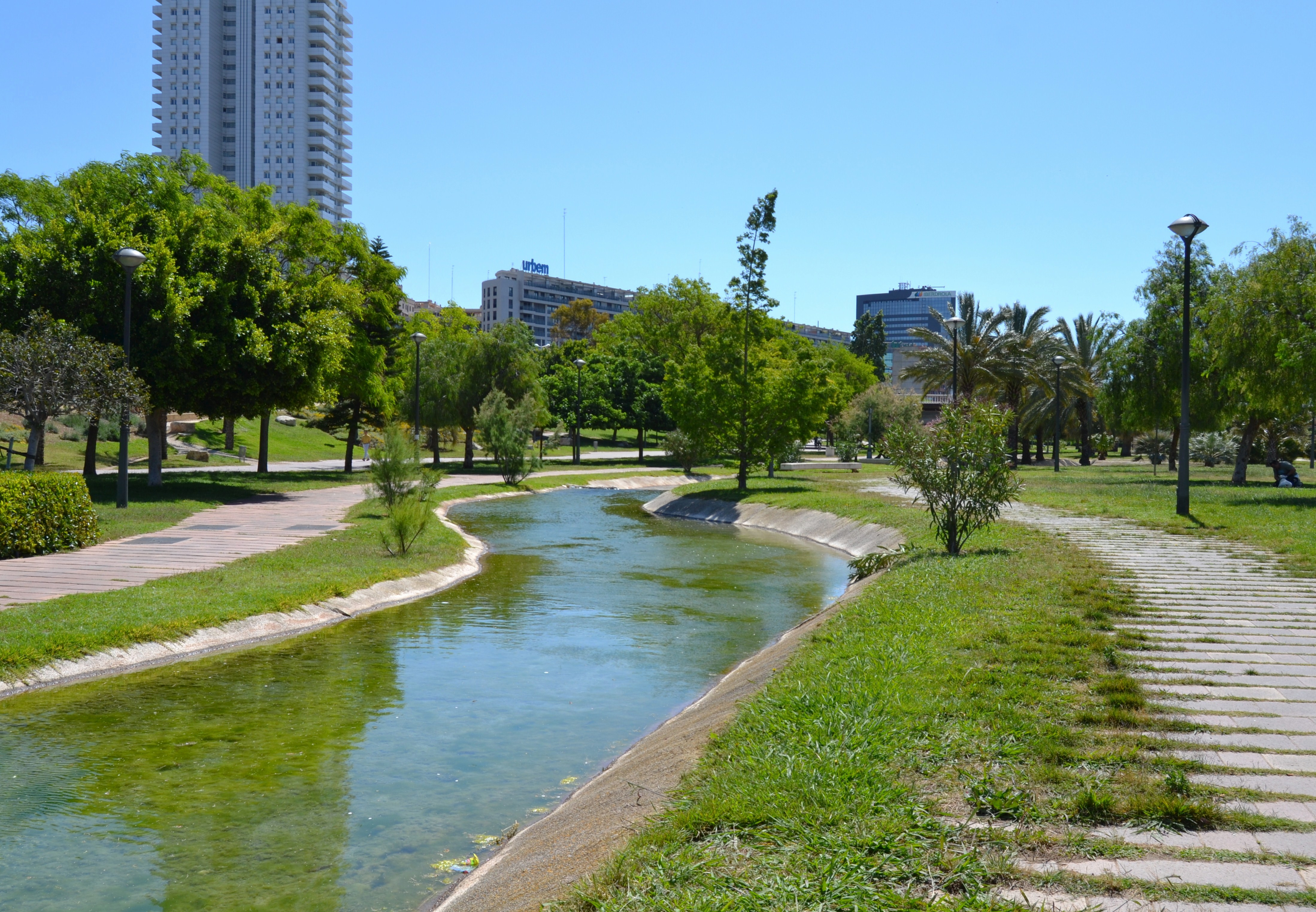
- The Jardín del Turia
- Interactive map of Turia Garden
- Type: Municipal
- Location: Valencia, Spain
- Area: 1,360,000 m^{2} (14,600,000 sq ft)
- Created: 1986
- Operator: CulTuria

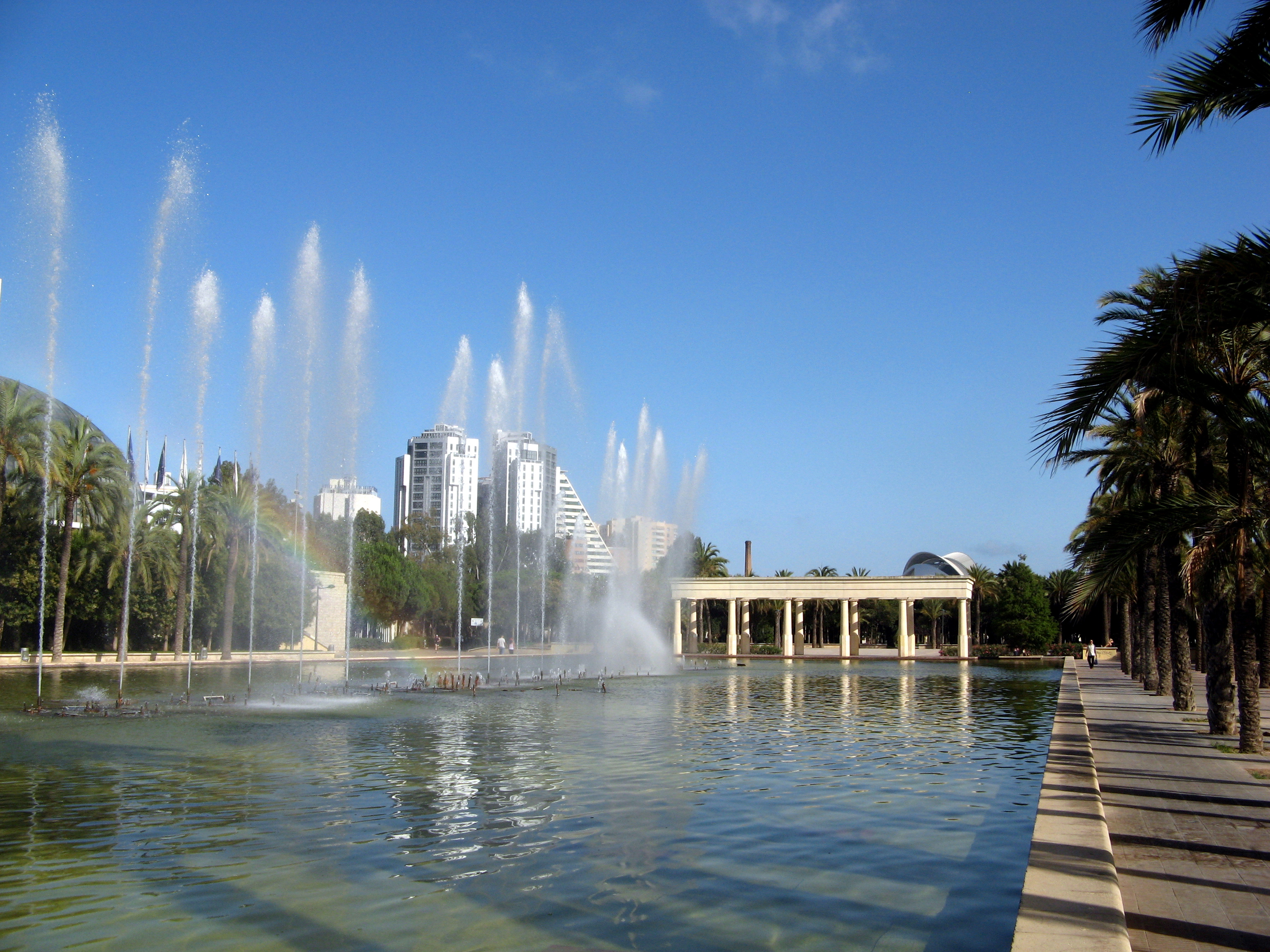
Fountain in the Jardín del Turia

The Turia Garden (Valencian: Jardí del Túria) is a public urban park located in the former riverbed of the Turia River in the city of Valencia, Spain. The park spans approximately 136 hectares, with plans to expand to 160.5 hectares in the future. It stretches nearly 8.5 kilometers in length, which will extend to almost 10 kilometers upon completion of the final section, with an average width of about 160 meters. It is one of the largest purely urban gardens in Spain.

The park begins at the border with the municipality of Mislata, adjacent to the Canaleta Park and Bioparc Valencia (inaugurated in 2008) at about 19 meters above sea level, and ends at Passeig de l'Albereda near the Oceanogràfic (inaugurated in 2003) at 1 meter above sea level.

Founded in 1986, decades after the Great Flood of Valencia, the garden was established following a transformation of the area from a proposed transportation corridor into a green space for leisure and nature. The idea for the garden emerged after the flood when the Spanish government and Valencia's city council planned to construct a major transportation axis. However, due to public demand for green spaces through the movement "El llit del Túria és nostre i el volem verd" ("The Turia riverbed is ours, and we want it green"), the plans shifted towards creating a park.

== History ==
=== Project ===
In 1957, Valencia experienced one of its most tragic events—the Great Flood of Valencia on October 14, 1957, which flooded the city and claimed at least 81 lives. The Spanish government and Valencia's city council decided that the Turia River could no longer safely flow through the city center due to the risk of future floods. In 1958, the decision was made to reroute the river to a nearby location through the "Plan Sur" and to convert the old riverbed into an urban highway.

However, citizens later demanded the old riverbed be turned into a green space, leading to the creation of a public garden. Over the years, the park was developed by top urban planners and designers, with fast-moving traffic diverted to the sides of the garden and some tunnels constructed to minimize impact. Ricardo Bofill (father) designed the section in the city's noble area with orange trees and palm trees near the Palau de la Música. The "Vetges Tú - Mediterrania" team designed the section from the Casa del Agua to Nuevo Centro, including sports facilities and fountains. The Department of Agriculture designed the "Urban Forest" section between Nuevo Centro and the Serranos sports area, planting thousands of pine trees. Later, the Gulliver garden was created.

=== Present day ===
Today, Jardí del Túria is a key meeting place in Valencia, attracting over three million visitors annually, making it the most visited park in Spain. The park integrates the Gulliver Park and the Parc de Capçalera, as well as the Palau de la Música, Bioparc, and the City of Arts and Sciences, which are located on adjacent lands outside the historic riverbed. Additionally, the riverbed has become a training ground for thousands of runners who traverse its nearly 8.5 kilometers daily, with a track exclusively for runners.

== Bridges ==
Jardí del Túria features numerous bridges, some over five centuries old, often destroyed by floods and rebuilt afterward. The bridges span from Parc de Capçalera to the Port, including:

- Pedestrian walkway at the Bioparc entrance
- Pont del Nou d'Octubre, the first bridge by Santiago Calatrava, built in 1989
- Pedestrian walkway of the Casa de l'Aigua
- Pont de Campanar
- Pont de les Glòries Valencianes (also known as 'd'Ademús')
- Pedestrian walkway of the former Patronat
- Pont de les Arts
- Pont de Sant Josep
- Pont de Serrans, recently pedestrianized
- Pont de Fusta, demolished and transformed into a pedestrian walkway with separate vehicle passage in 2012
- Pont de la Trinitat, with closed access stairs awaiting technical solutions
- Pont del Real, widened in 1968
- Pont de l'Exposició (popularly known as 'de la peineta' or 'de Calatrava')
- Pont de les Flors
- Pont del Mar, historically the natural route connecting the city to the port. Built in 1591 after the previous wooden or masonry bridge was destroyed by a flood in 1589. In 1933, it was pedestrianized, with grand staircases added by architect Javier Goerlich. The bridge features ten lowered pointed arches of 15.50 meters each and is 160 meters long and 8.35 meters wide, adorned with images of the Virgin of the Forsaken and Saint Paschal. Recently, a large circular pond was added under its arches during the garden landscaping.
- Pont d'Aragó
- Pont de l'Àngel Custodi, widened in 1967
- Pont del Regne (popularly known as 'de las gàrgoles'), built where the old Valencia-Barcelona railway bridge once stood
- Pont de Montolivet, designed by José Antonio Fernández Ordóñez, later extended by Santiago Calatrava after lowering the terrain's elevation for the City of Sciences
- Pont de l'Assut d'Or (popularly known as 'jamonero'), the third complete bridge by architect Santiago Calatrava
- Railway bridge to Barcelona, originally single-track; the current bridge was built nearby, with the old one demolished after the Grao station was decommissioned.
- 'Cuc de llum' bridge, a pedestrian walkway built as a southwest entrance to the F1 Urban Circuit, closed to the public outside of events
- Pont de Drassanes

The section of Jardí del Turia between the bridges of l'Assut de l'Or and the railway is 50% urbanized, with the remaining 50% awaiting the burial of the existing stormwater collector. The section between the railway bridge and Drassanes is pending urbanization, with a natural water table present. Beyond Drassanes, there is a small stagnant water body, and the rest of the former riverbed to the sea has been diverted, buried, and channeled under the Port of Valencia.

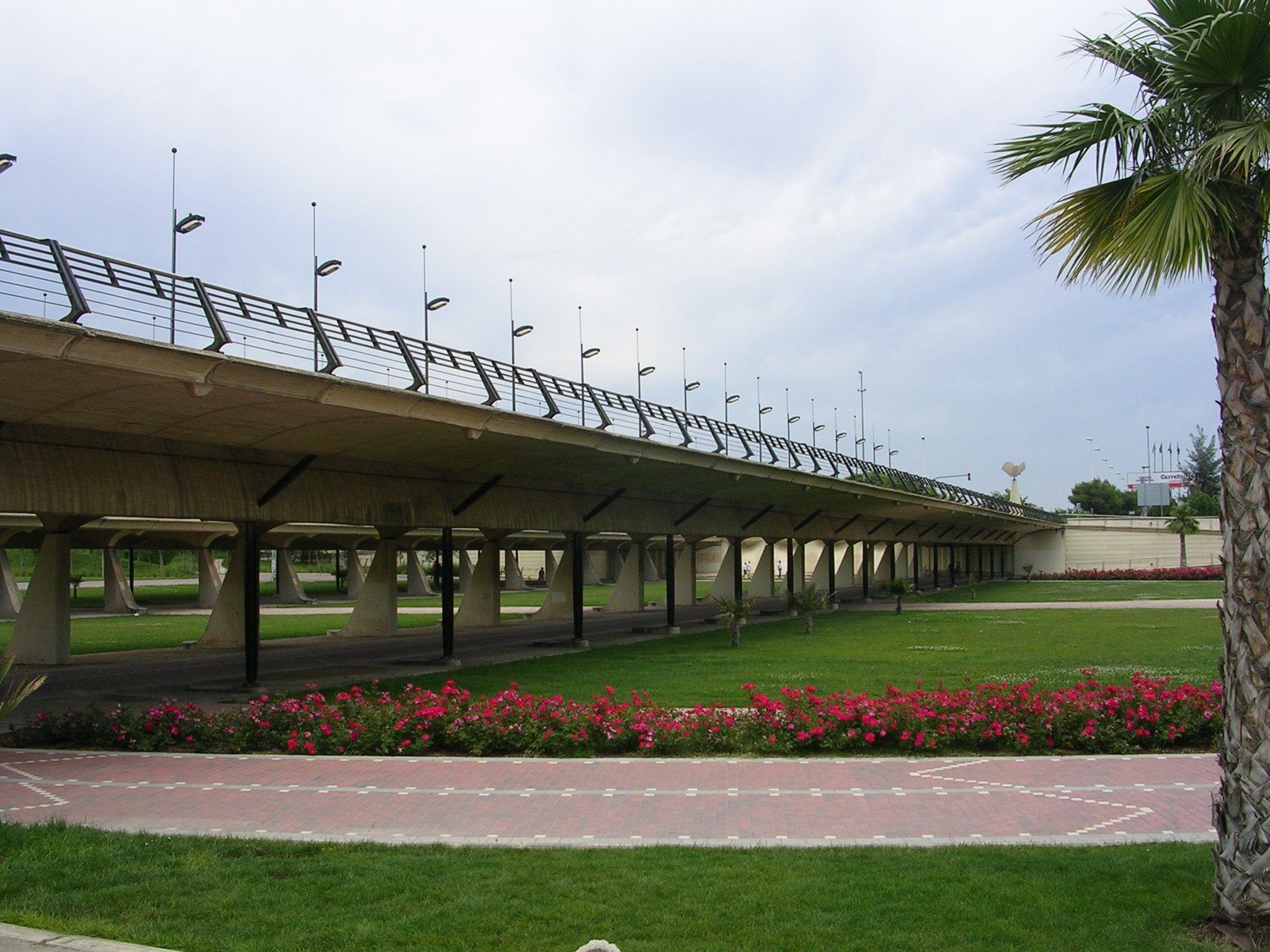
Pont Nou d'Octubre

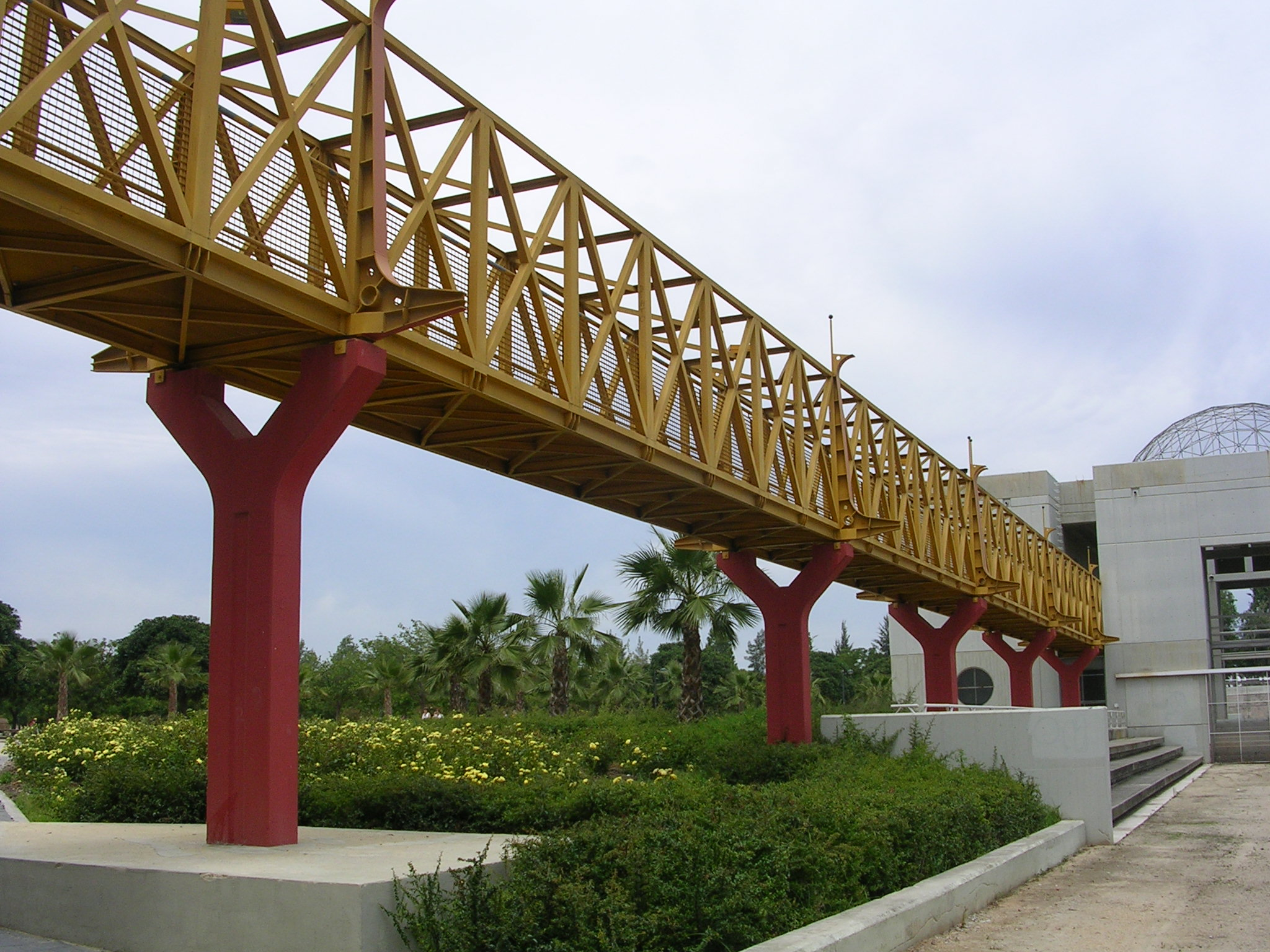
Pedestrian walkway of the Casa de l'Aigua

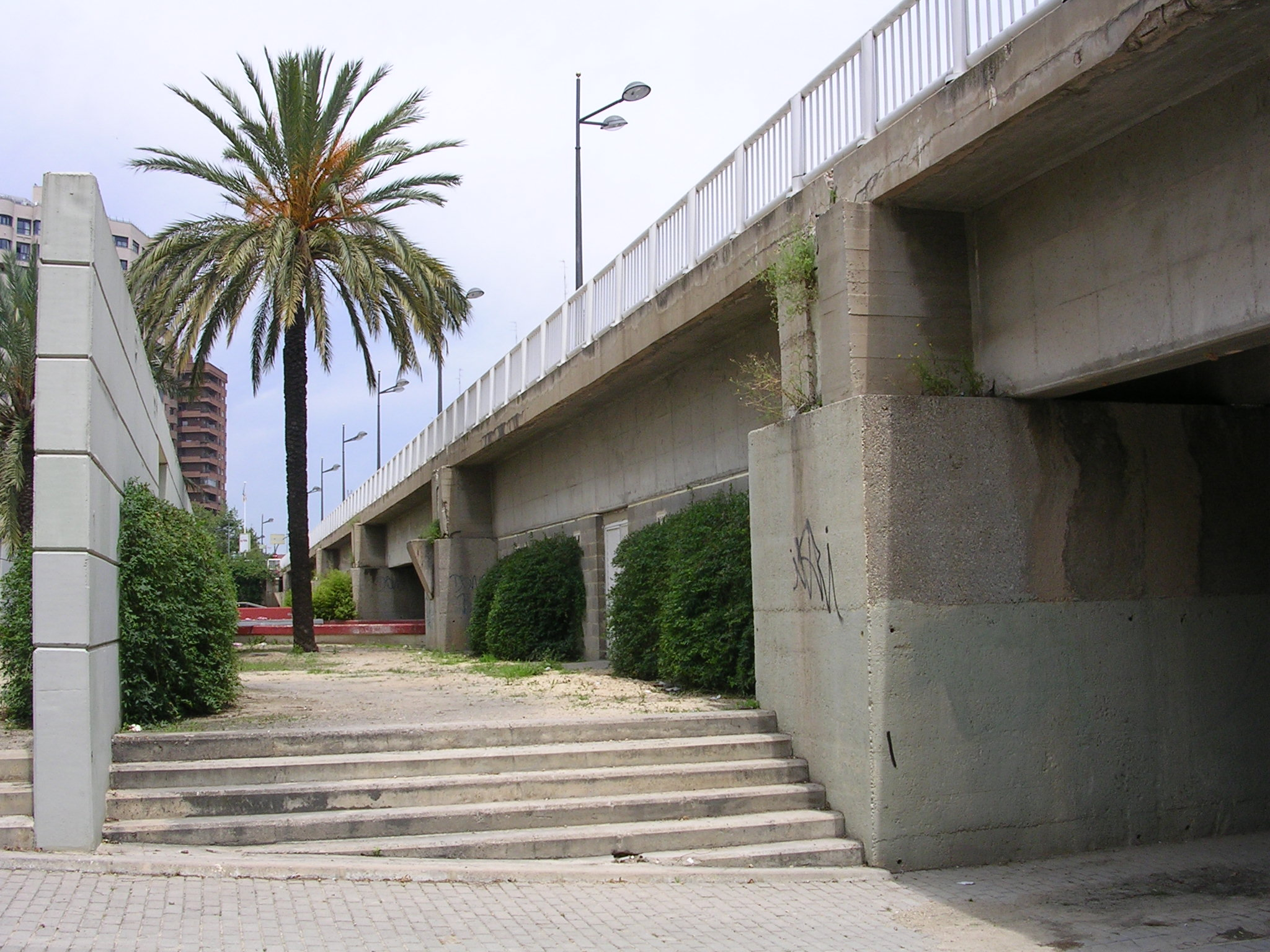
Pont de Campanar

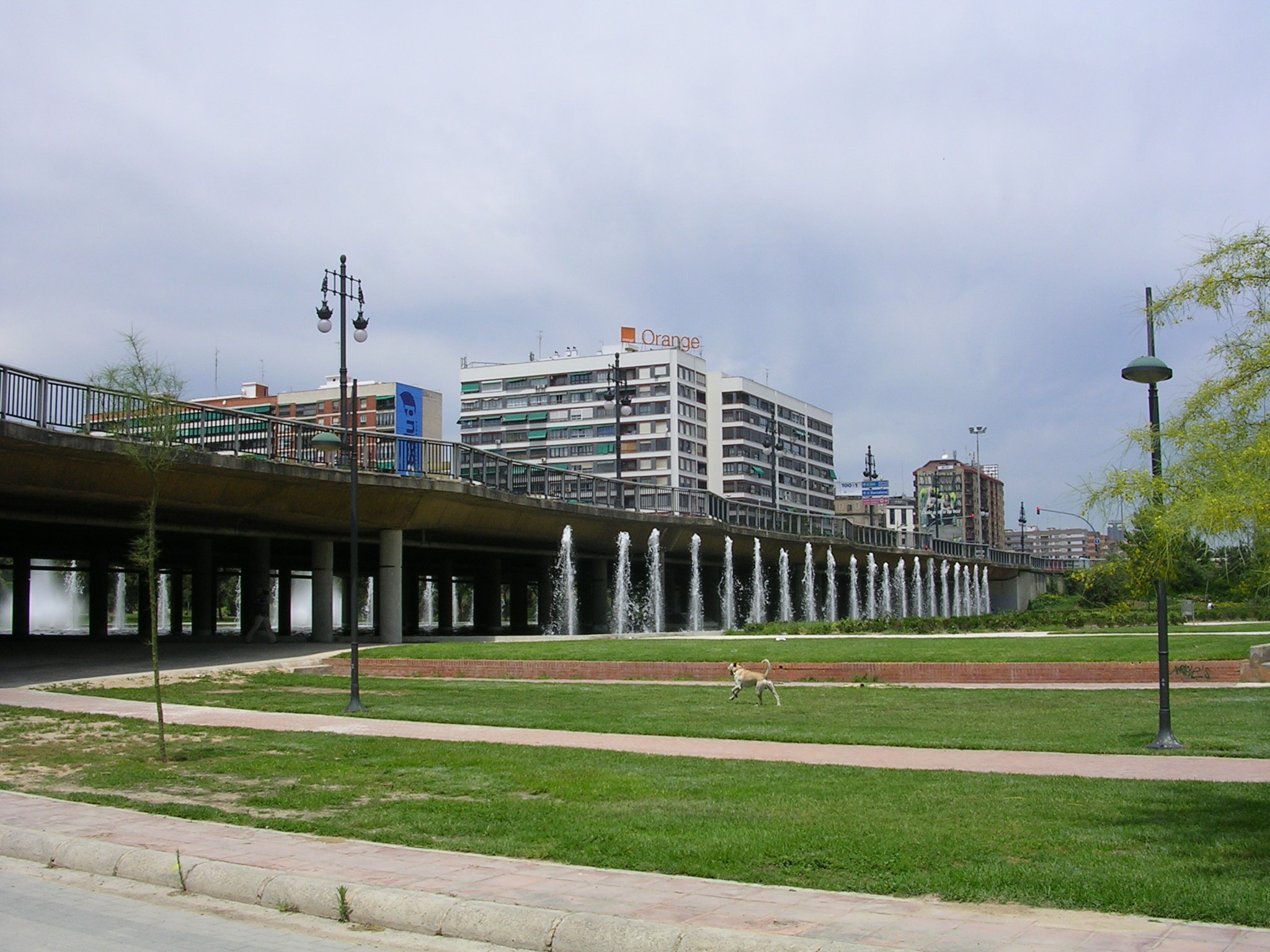
Pont de les Glòries Valencianes

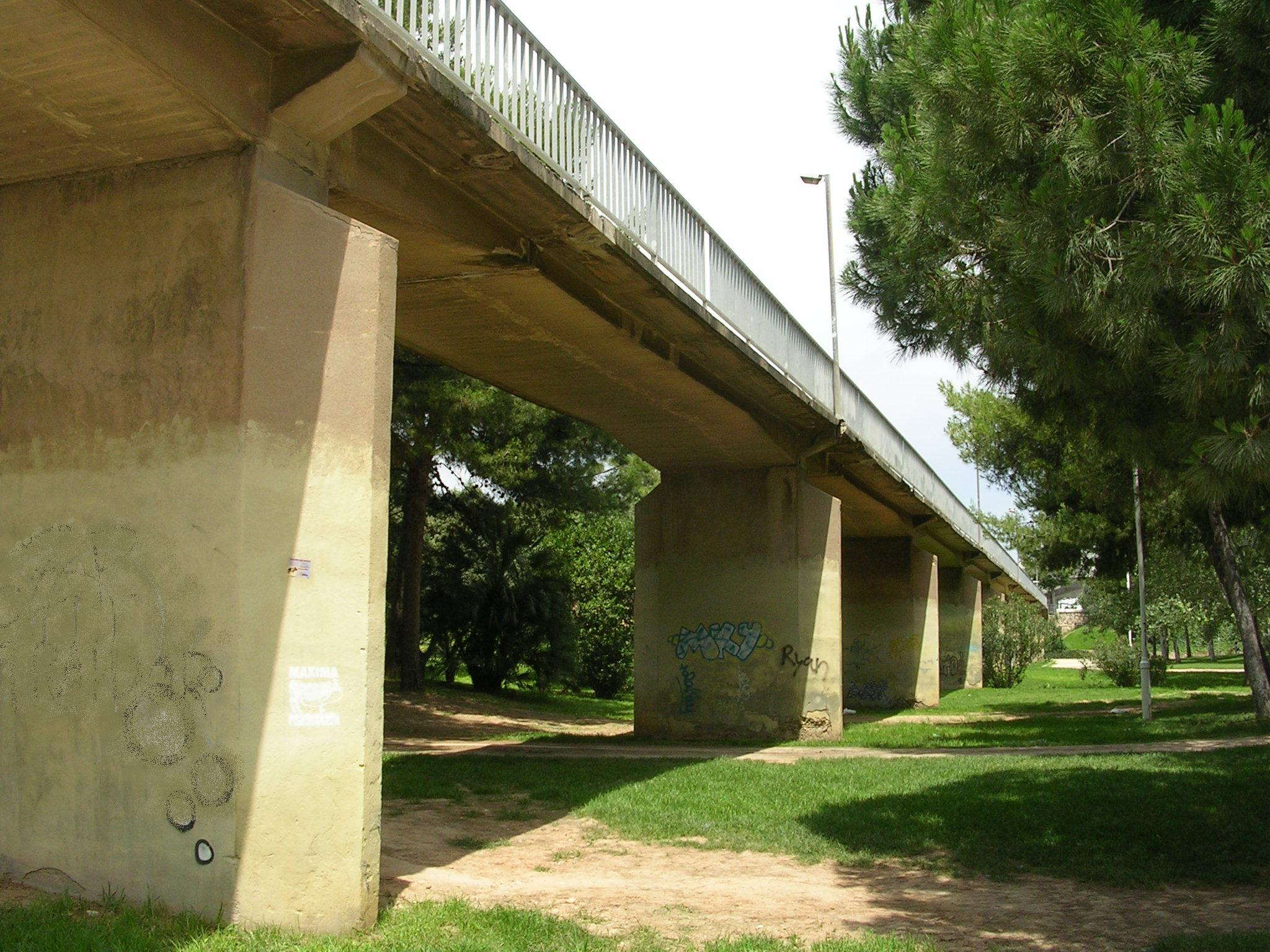
Pedestrian walkway of the former Patronat

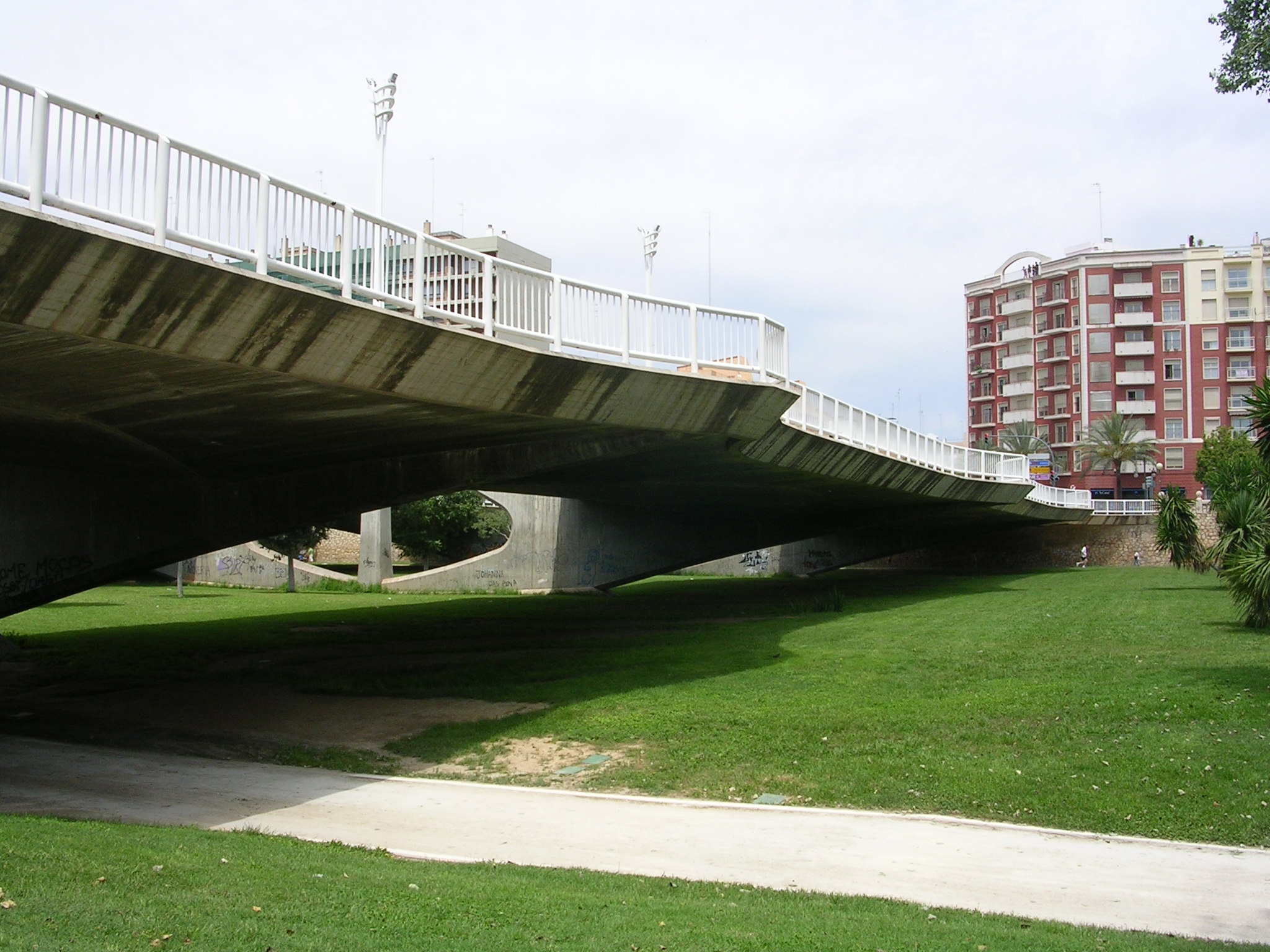
Pont de les Arts

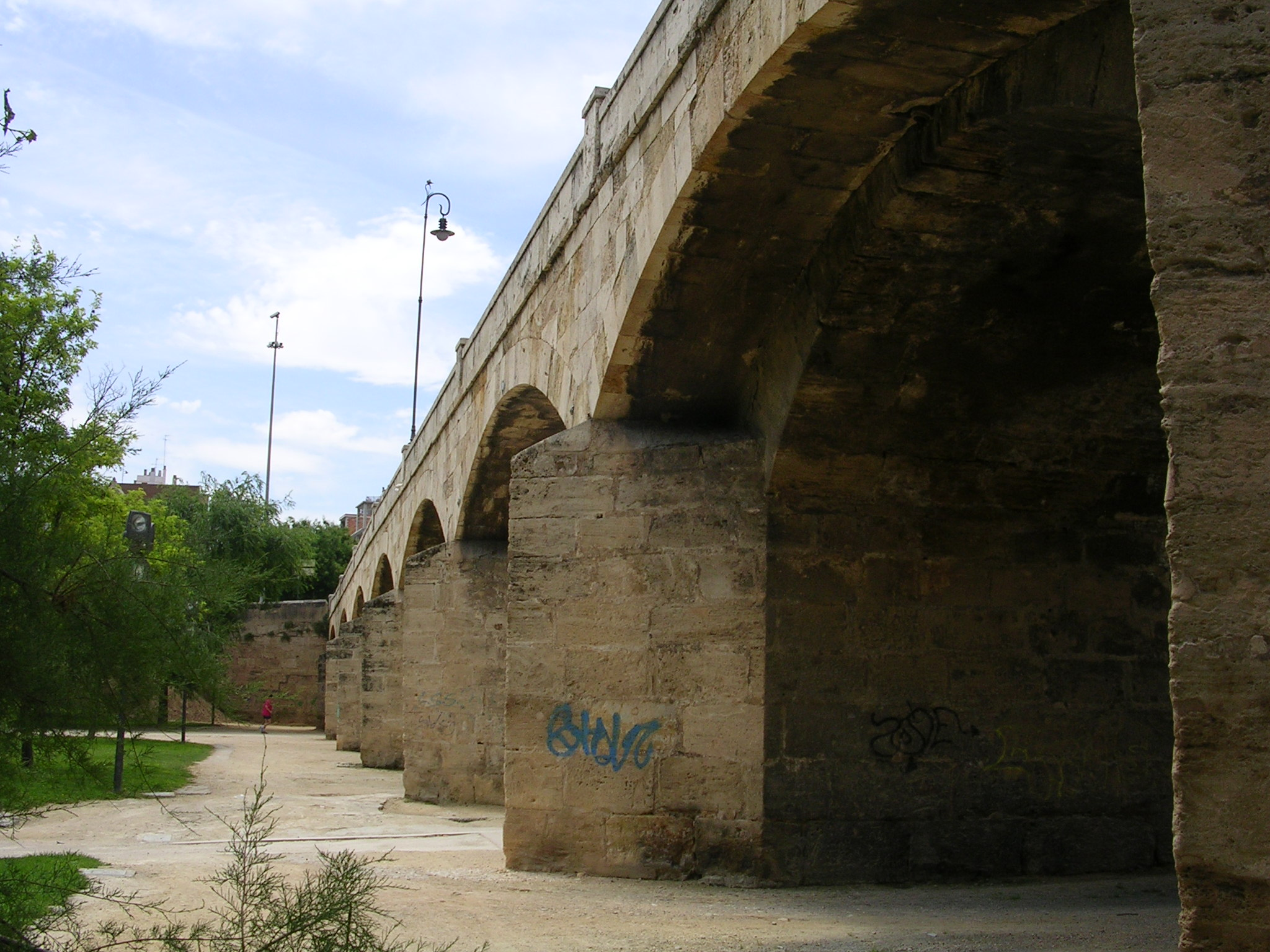
Pont de Sant Josep

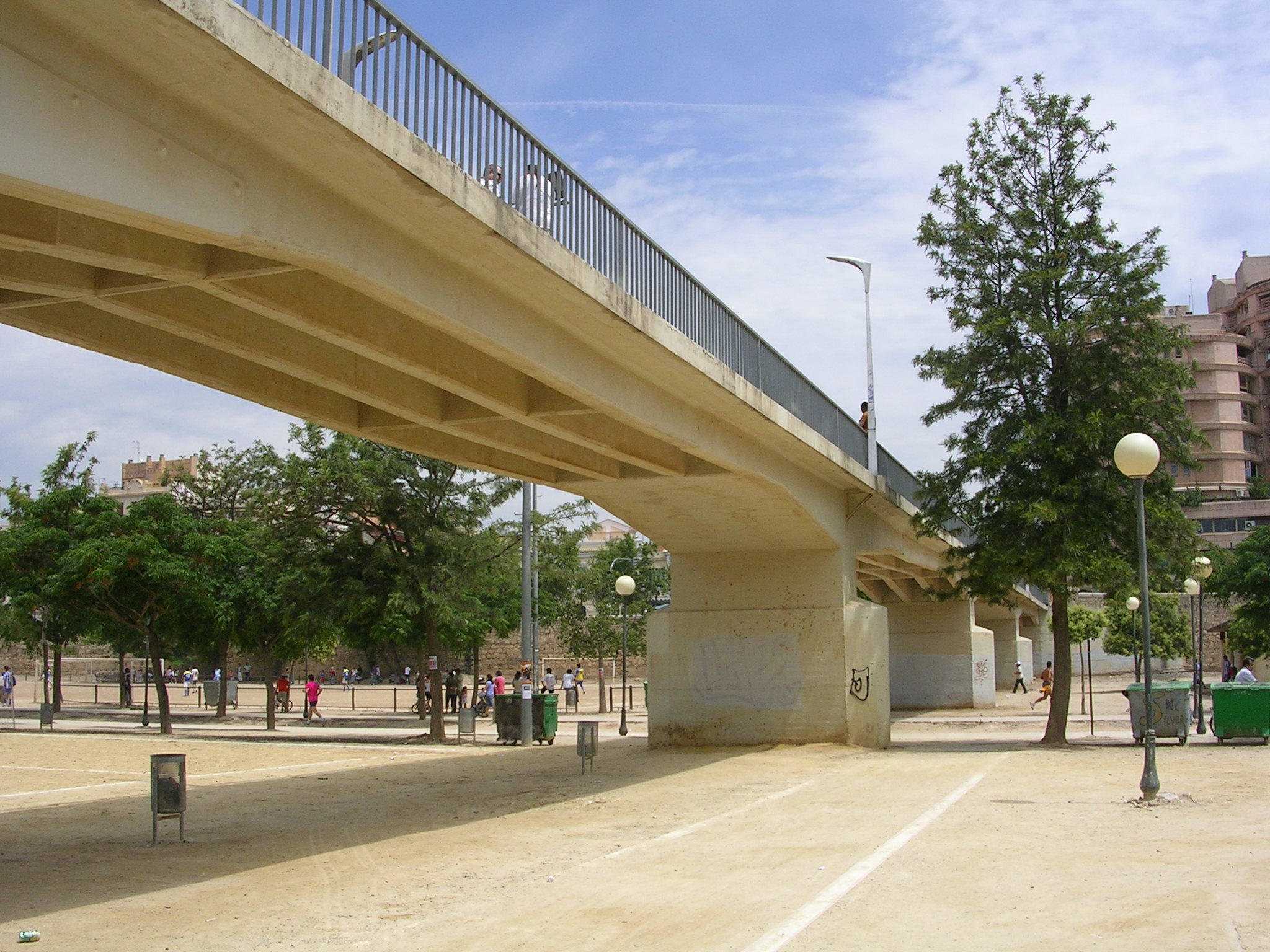
Old Pont de Fusta

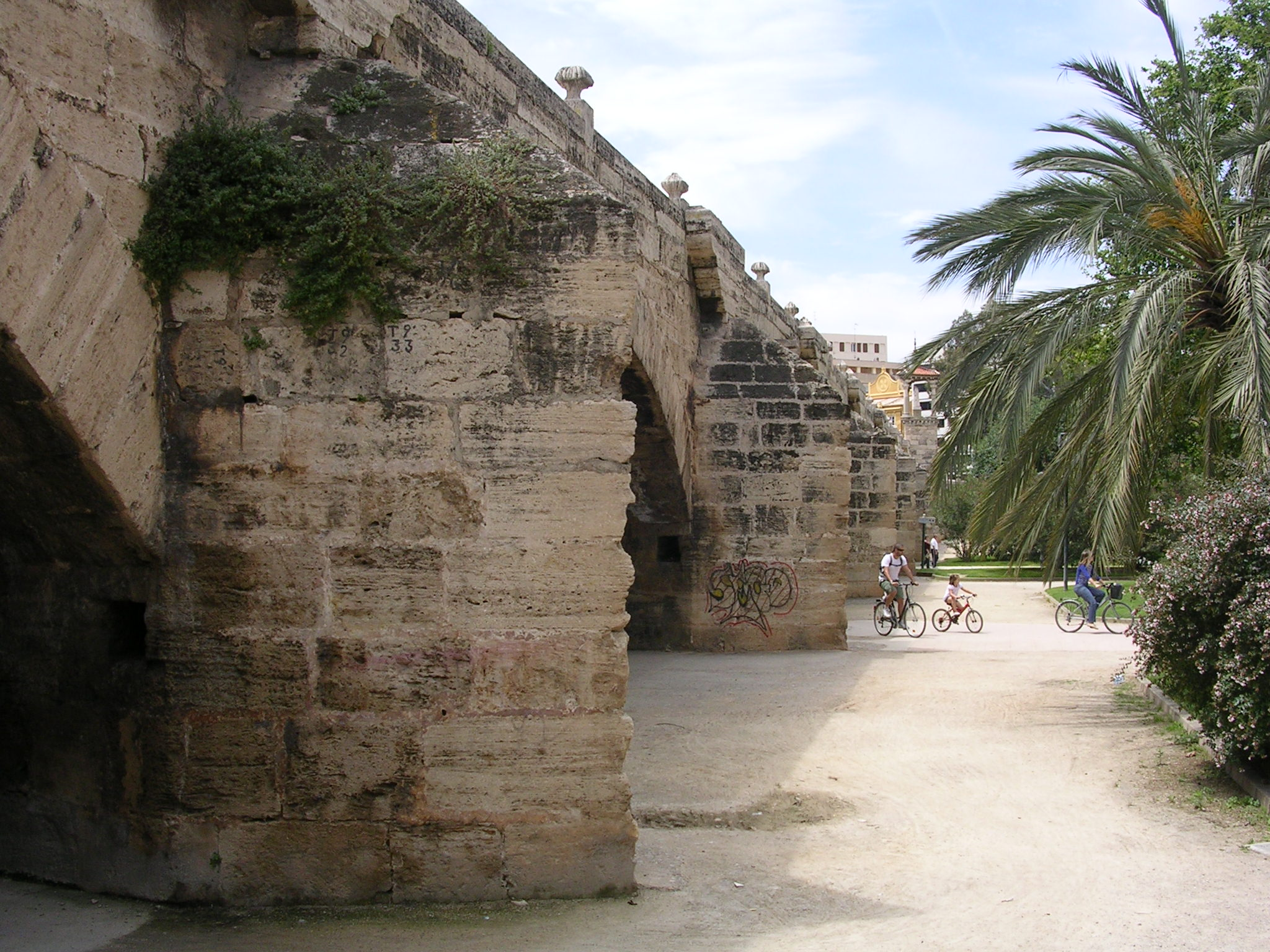
Pont del Real

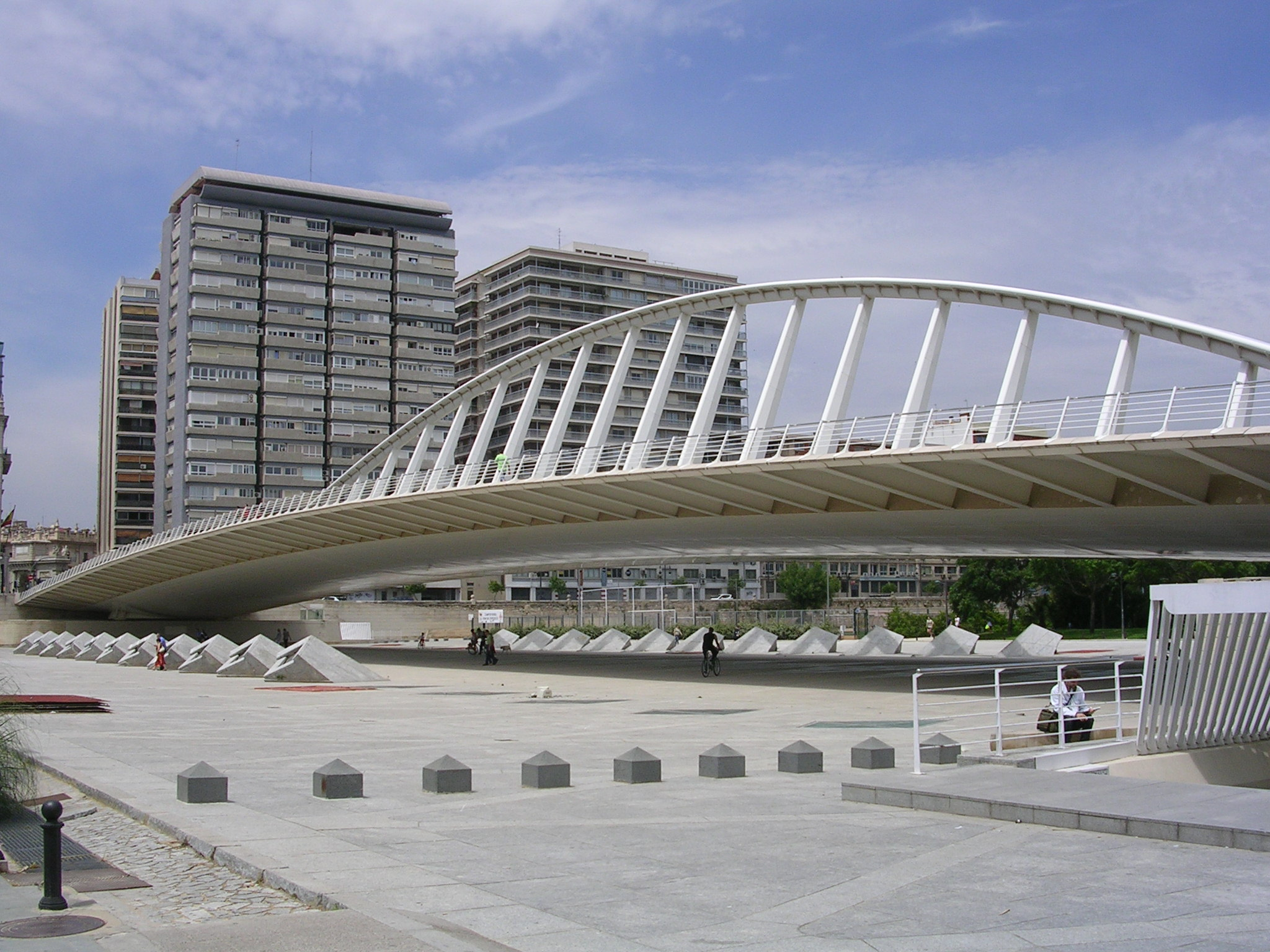
Pont de l'Exposició

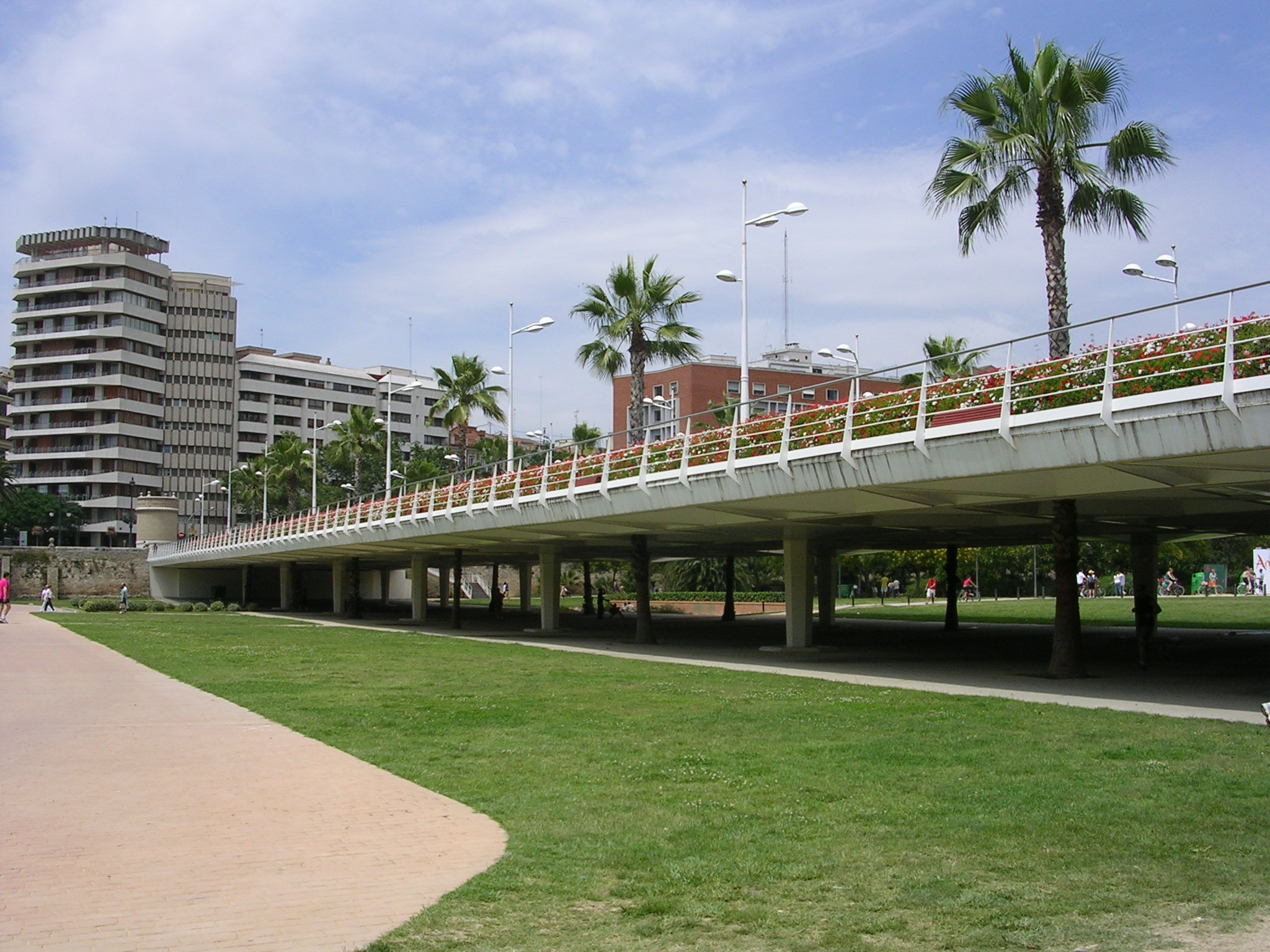
Pont de les Flors

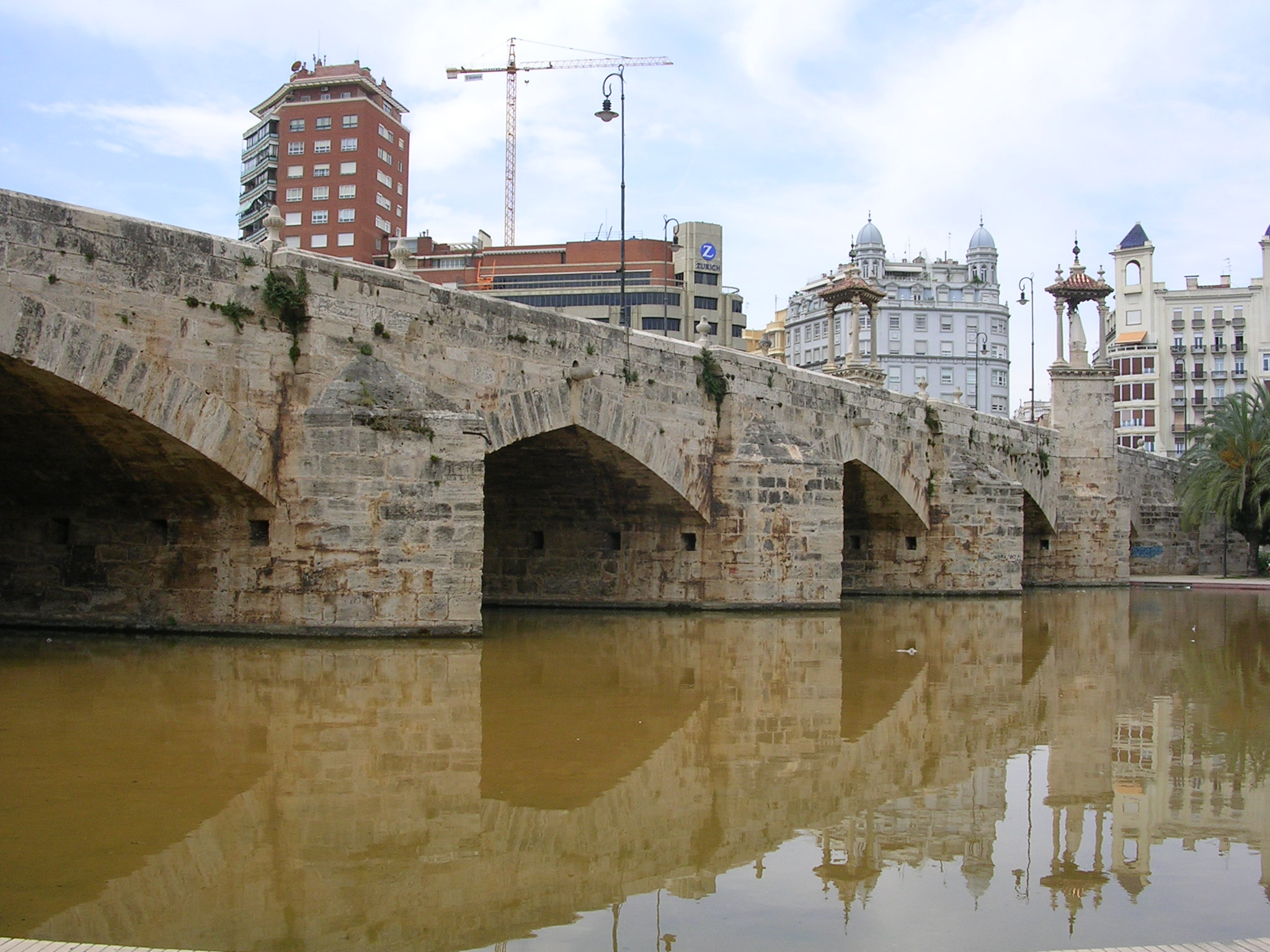
Pont del Mar

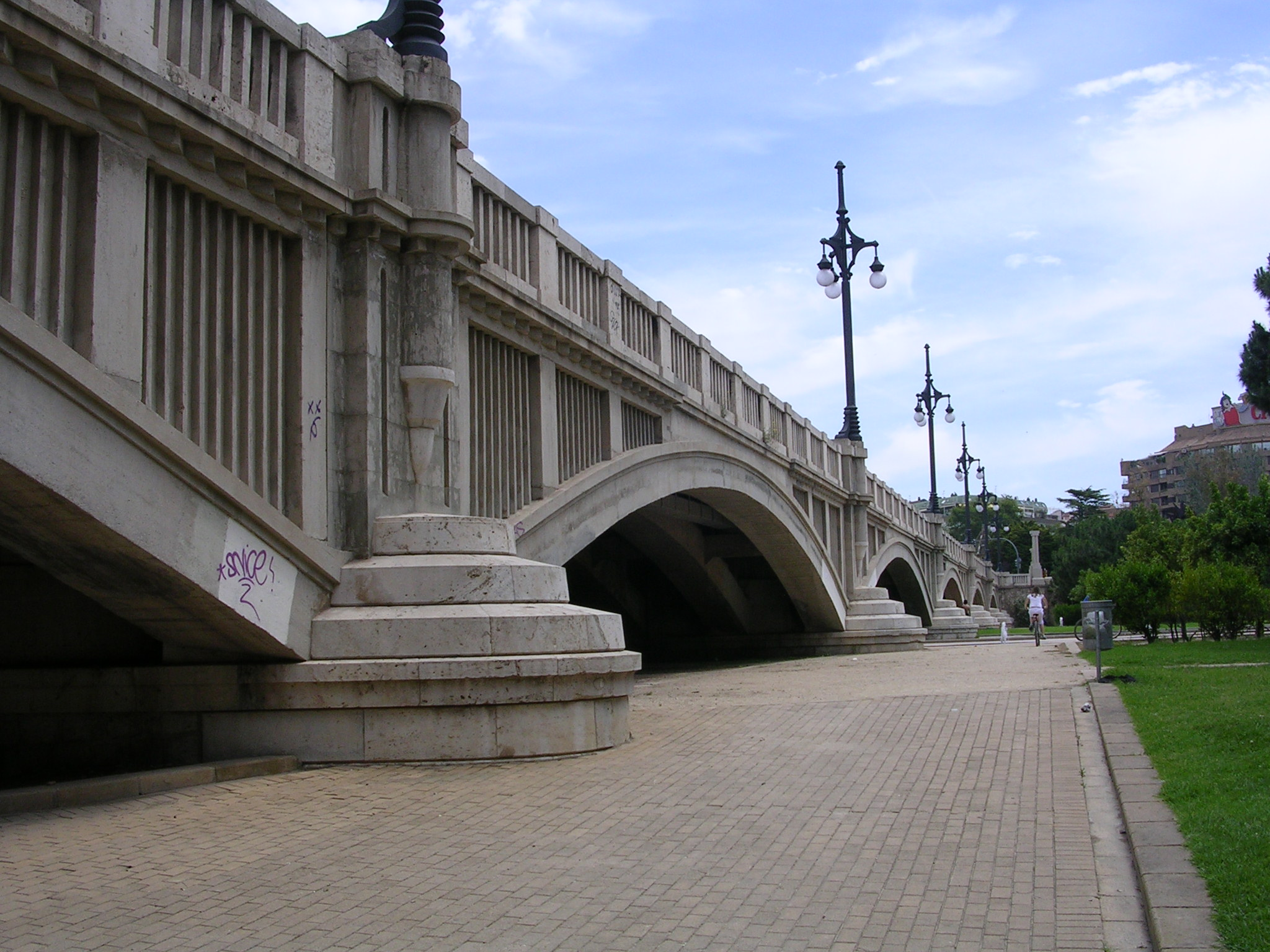
Pont d'Aragó

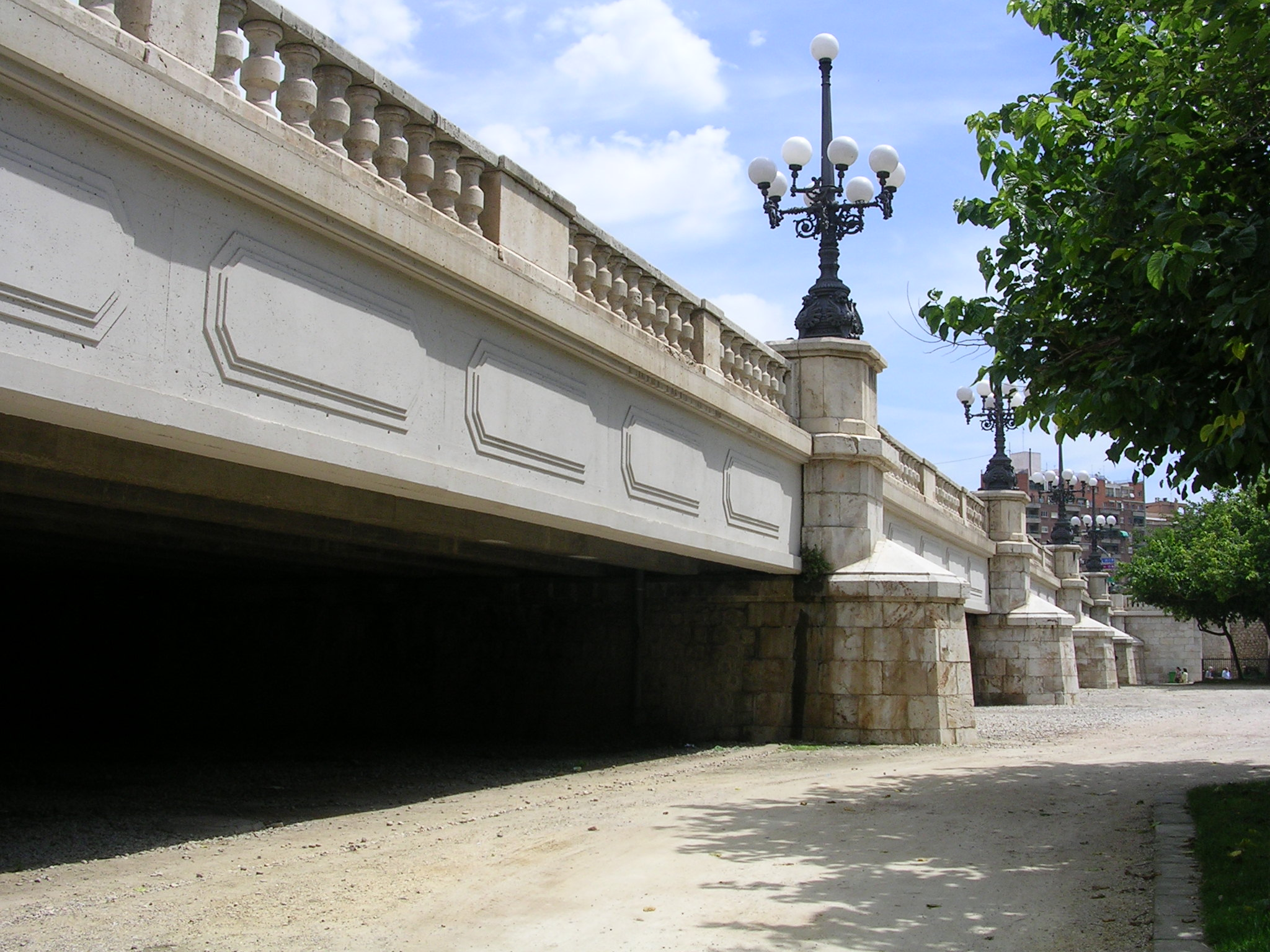
Pont de l'Àngel Custodi

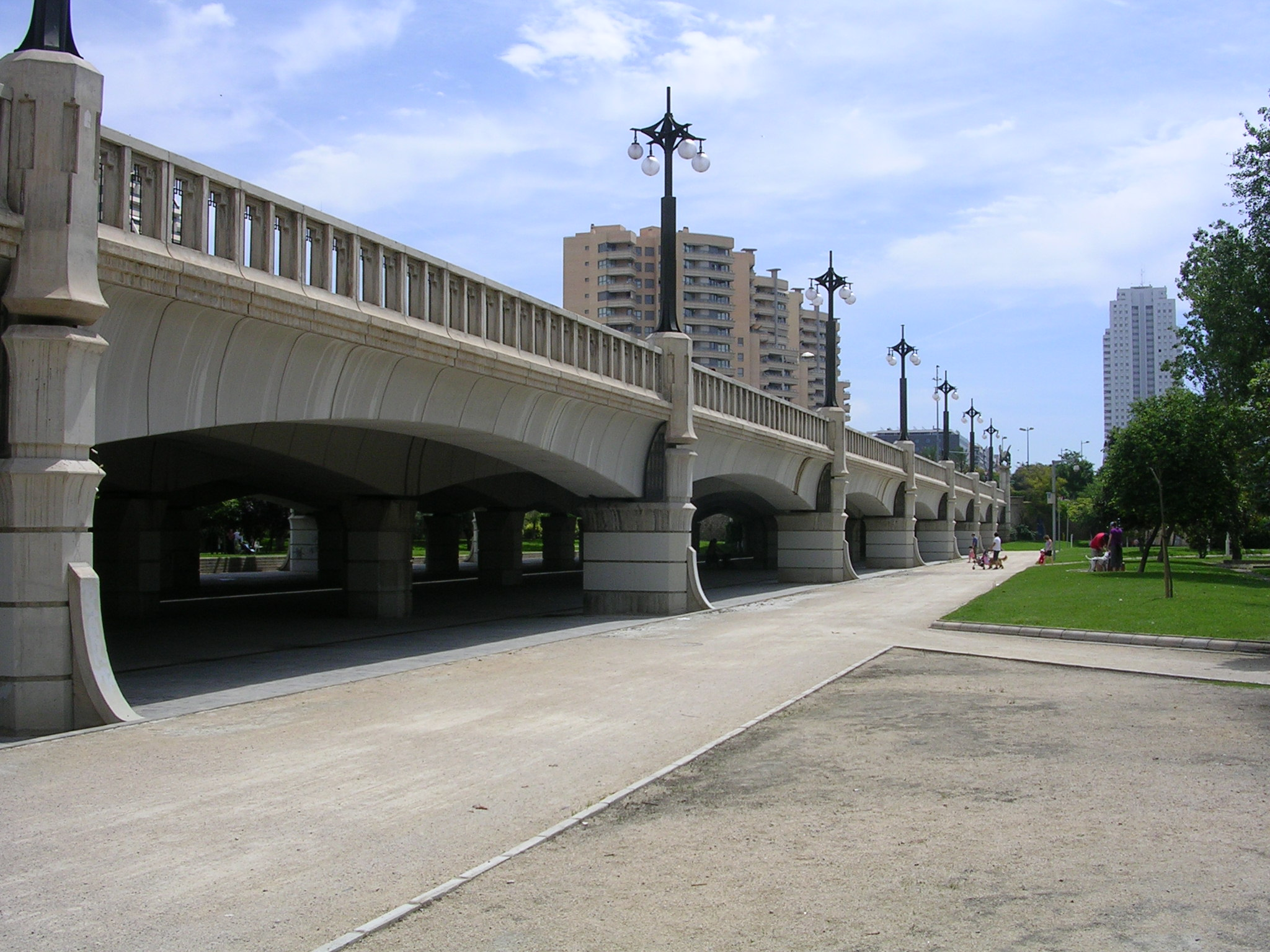
Pont del Regne

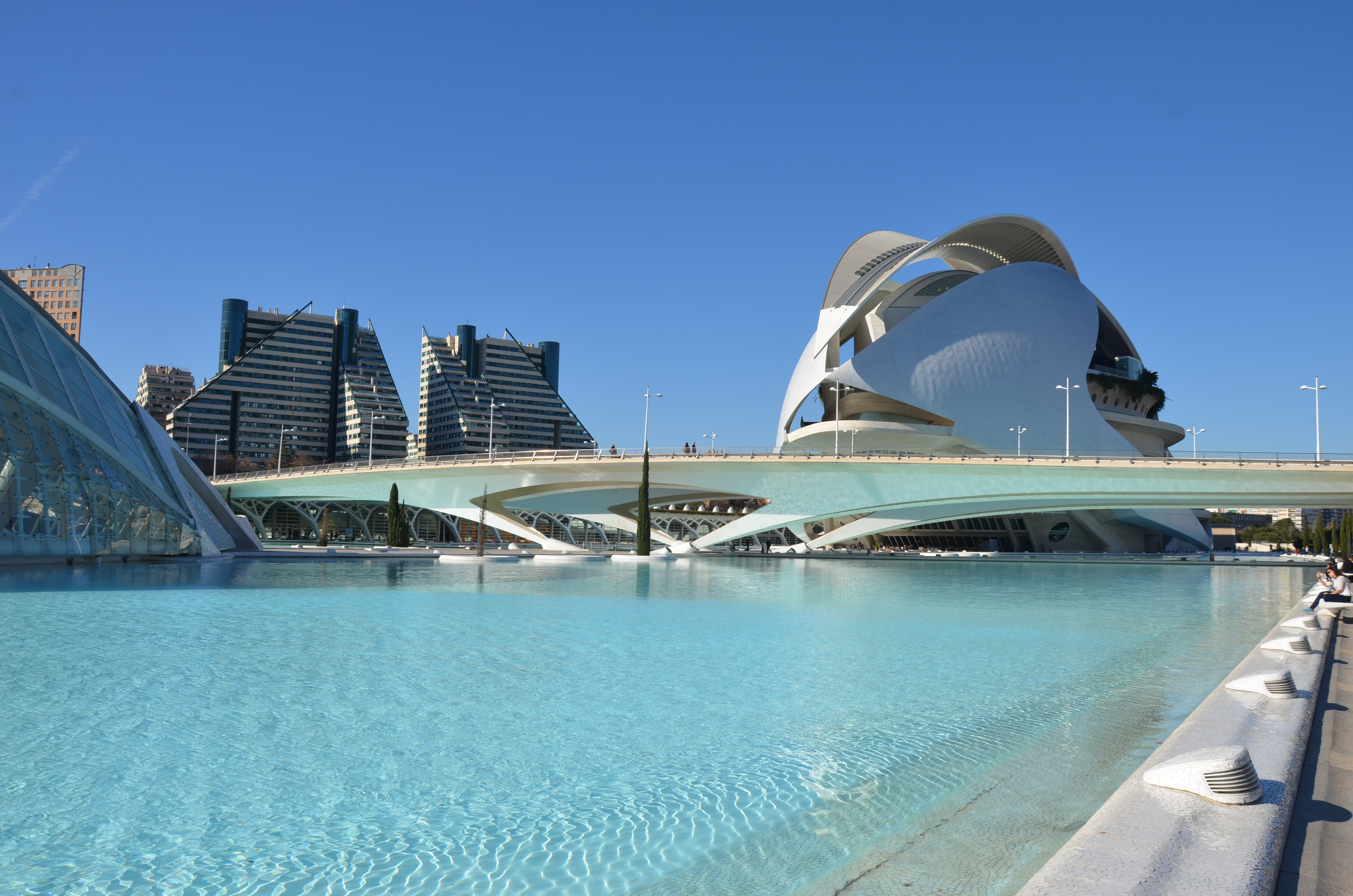
Pont de Montolivet, with the Palau de les Arts Reina Sofía in the background
