= L'Oceanogràfic =

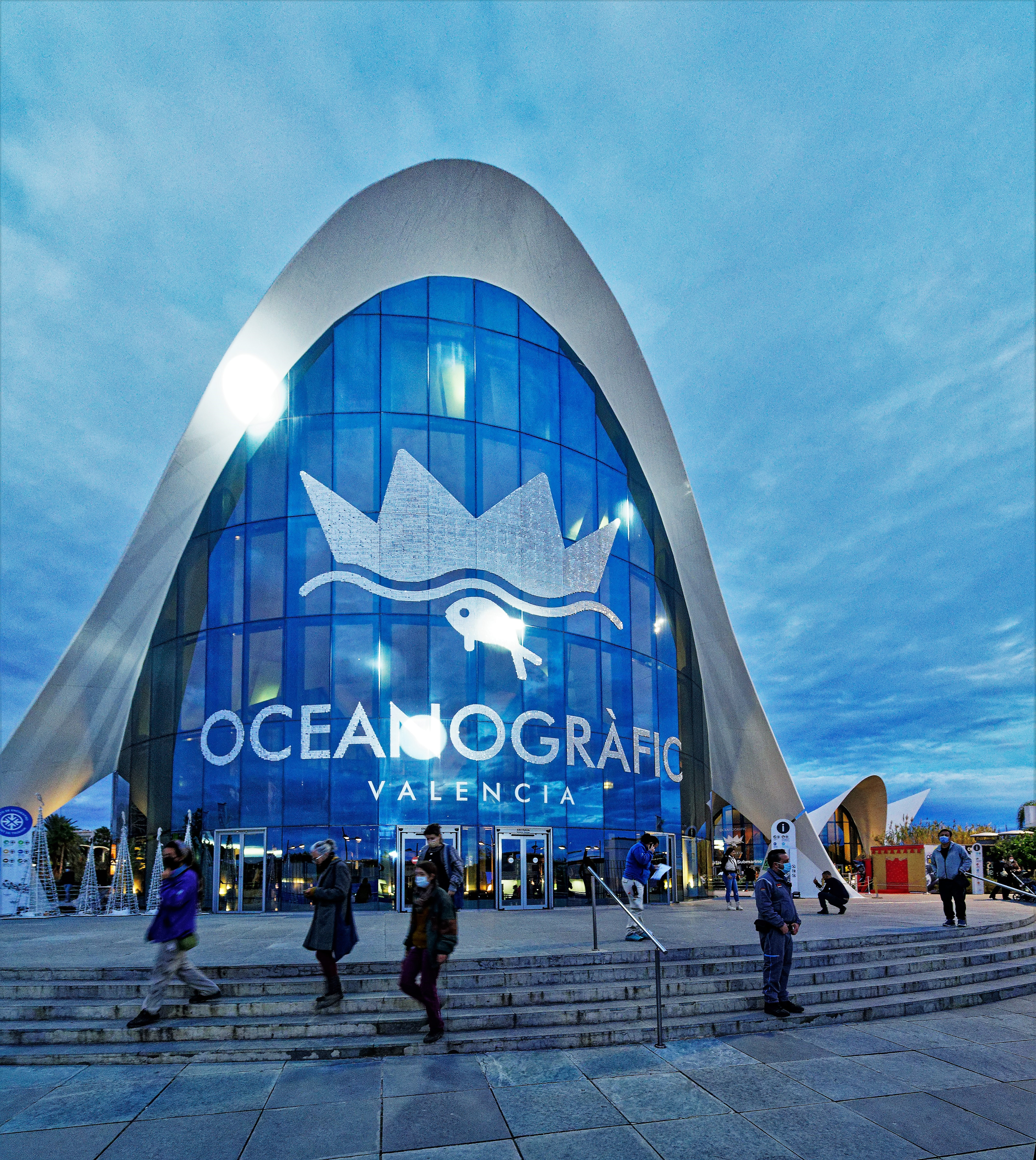
- Entrance to the marine complex
- Interactive map of L'Oceanogràfic
- 39.45279°N 0.34812°W
- Date opened: 14 February 2003
- Location: City of Arts and Sciences, Valencia, Spain
- Land area: 110,000 square metres (1,200,000 sq ft)
- No. of animals: 45,000
- No. of species: 500
- Volume of largest tank: 7,000,000 litres (1,800,000 US gal)
- Total volume of tanks: 42,000,000 litres (11,000,000 US gal)
- Owner: Avanqua Oceanogràfic SL
- Website: www.cac.es/en/oceanografic/

L'Oceanogràfic (Valencian: [loseˌanoˈɣɾafik], Spanish: El Oceanográfico [el oˌθeanoˈɣɾafiko], 'The Oceanographic') is an oceanarium situated in the Garden of the Turia to the southeast of the city center of Valencia, Spain, where different marine habitats are represented. It was designed by the architect Félix Candela and the structural engineers Alberto Domingo and Carlos Lázaro. It is integrated inside the cultural complex known as the City of Arts and Sciences. It was opened on 14 February 2003.

== General information ==
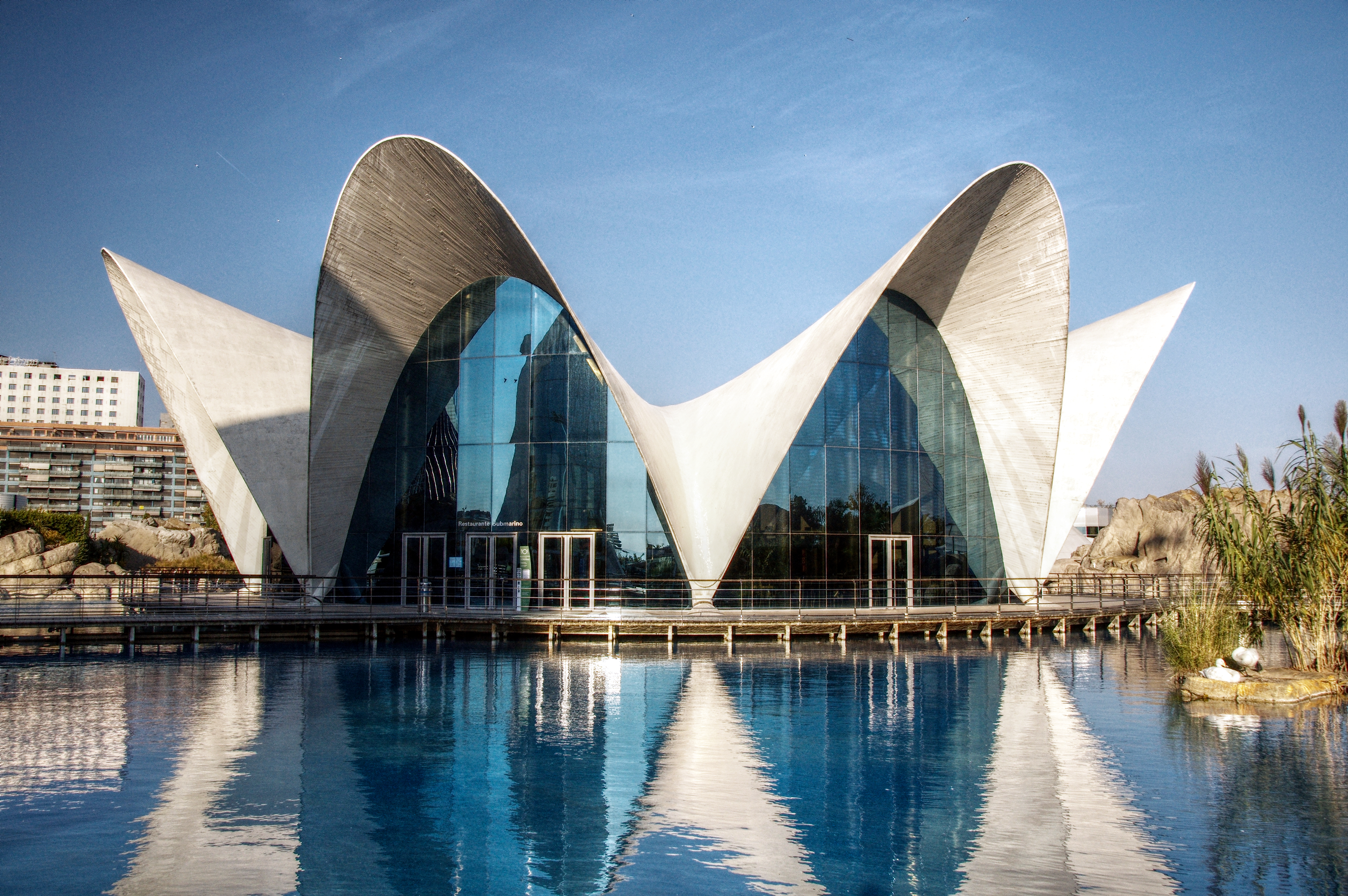
The underwater restaurant

The Oceanographic is the largest complex of its type in Europe, spanning 110,000 square metres (1,200,000 sq ft) and holding a capacity of 42,000,000 litres (11,000,000 US gal) of water, including a 26,000,000-litre (6,900,000 US gal) dolphinarium and a 7,000,000-litre (1,800,000 US gal) ocean tank with sharks, rays and other fish. It is home to 45,000 animals from 500 different species—including sharks, penguins, dolphins, sea lions, beluga whales, birds, reptiles and invertebrate—all inhabiting nine two-tiered underwater towers representing the Earth's major ecosystems. The aquariums utilize sea water pumped from the La Malva-Rosa beach.

The park is divided into ten areas: the marine areas are arranged into Mediterranean habitats, the Arctic Ocean, Arctic islands, the tropics, the temperate seas and the Red Sea. The park also includes a dolphinarium, an area of mangrove swamps and marshland, and a garden with more than 80 different species of plants.

It is home to approximately 45,000 animals from 500 different species—including sharks, penguins, dolphins, sea lions, beluga whales, birds, reptiles and invertebrates—all inhabiting nine two-tiered underwater towers representing the Earth's major ecosystems.

== Marineland animal transfers ==
In August 2026, L'Oceanogràfic became one of five aquariums participating in the relocation of marine mammals from the closed Marineland of Canada in Niagara Falls, Ontario. Two female beluga whales, Cleopatra and Jelly Bean, and four female bottlenose dolphins, Tsunami, Lida, Echo and Marina, arrived at L'Oceanogràfic in the early hours of August 27, 2026.

The six animals were transported from Marineland to Toronto Pearson International Airport and flown to Valencia Airport aboard a specially chartered aircraft. The direct flight took approximately seven hours. The animals were accompanied by veterinarians and animal-care specialists during the journey and were transported from the airport to L'Oceanogràfic after landing.

Cleopatra and Jelly Bean were approximately 23 and 19 years old, respectively, at the time of the transfer. They joined the belugas already maintained at L'Oceanogràfic and began a period of acclimatization under veterinary observation. The four dolphins were also placed under an adaptation and monitoring program following their arrival. Jelly Bean died on September 18, 2026.

The transfer removed the final dolphins from Marineland and formed part of a wider relocation of 30 belugas and four dolphins from the Canadian park to aquariums in Spain and the United States.

== Design and operation ==
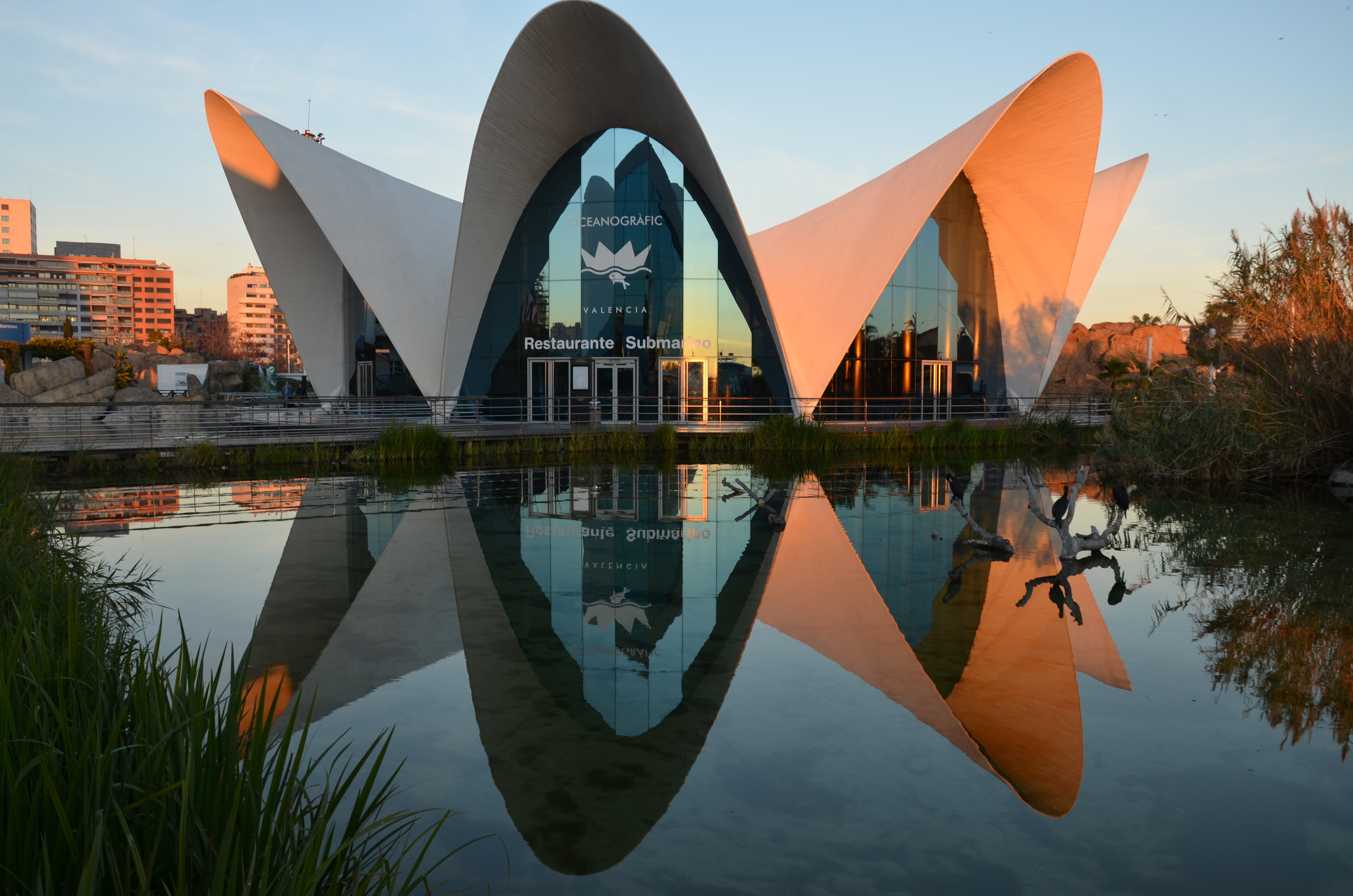
Candela's thin-shell roofs at L'Oceanogràfic (2019)

The steel-fiber reinforced concrete thin-shell structure was designed by renown architect Félix Candela, at age 87 in 1997, and structural engineers Alberto Domingo and Carlos Lázaro. The distinctive hyperbolic parabola (hypars) shape of the roof is reminiscent of the Los Manantiales Restaurant in Mexico City, which Candela designed in 1958.

== Transportation ==
L'Oceanogràfic can be reached via Metro, disembark at Alameda Station or through bus number 15, 25 and 95. It is also served by Metrovalencia Line 10 tram from its Oceanogràfic stop.

== Gallery ==
Tour of L'Oceanogràfic in Valencia

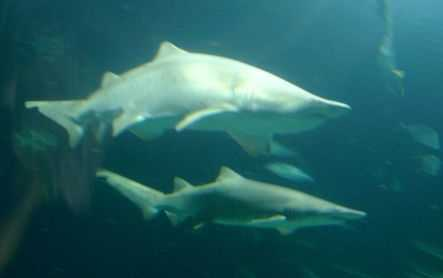
Sand tiger sharks in the ocean tank

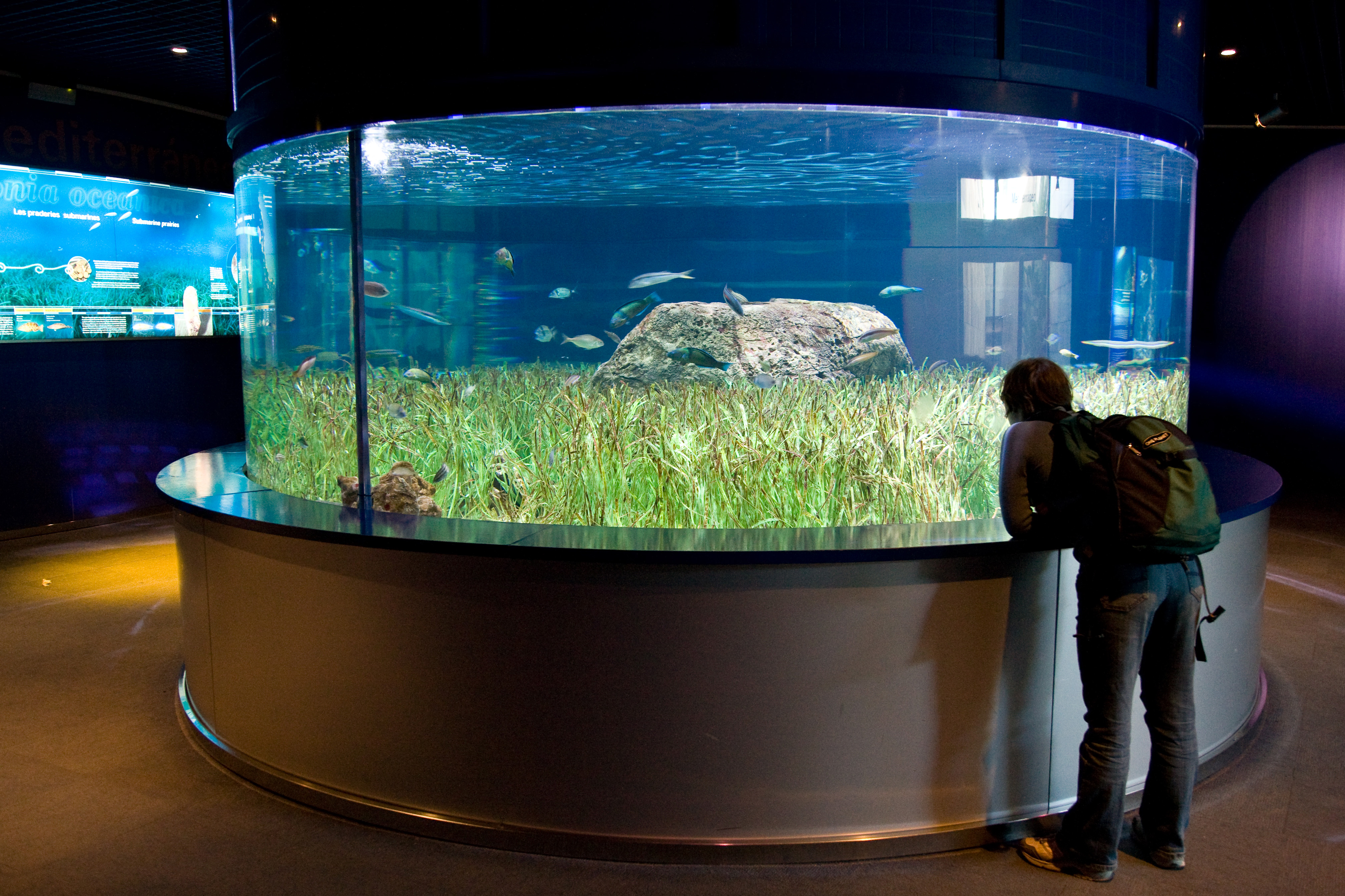
Mediterranean seagrass aquarium

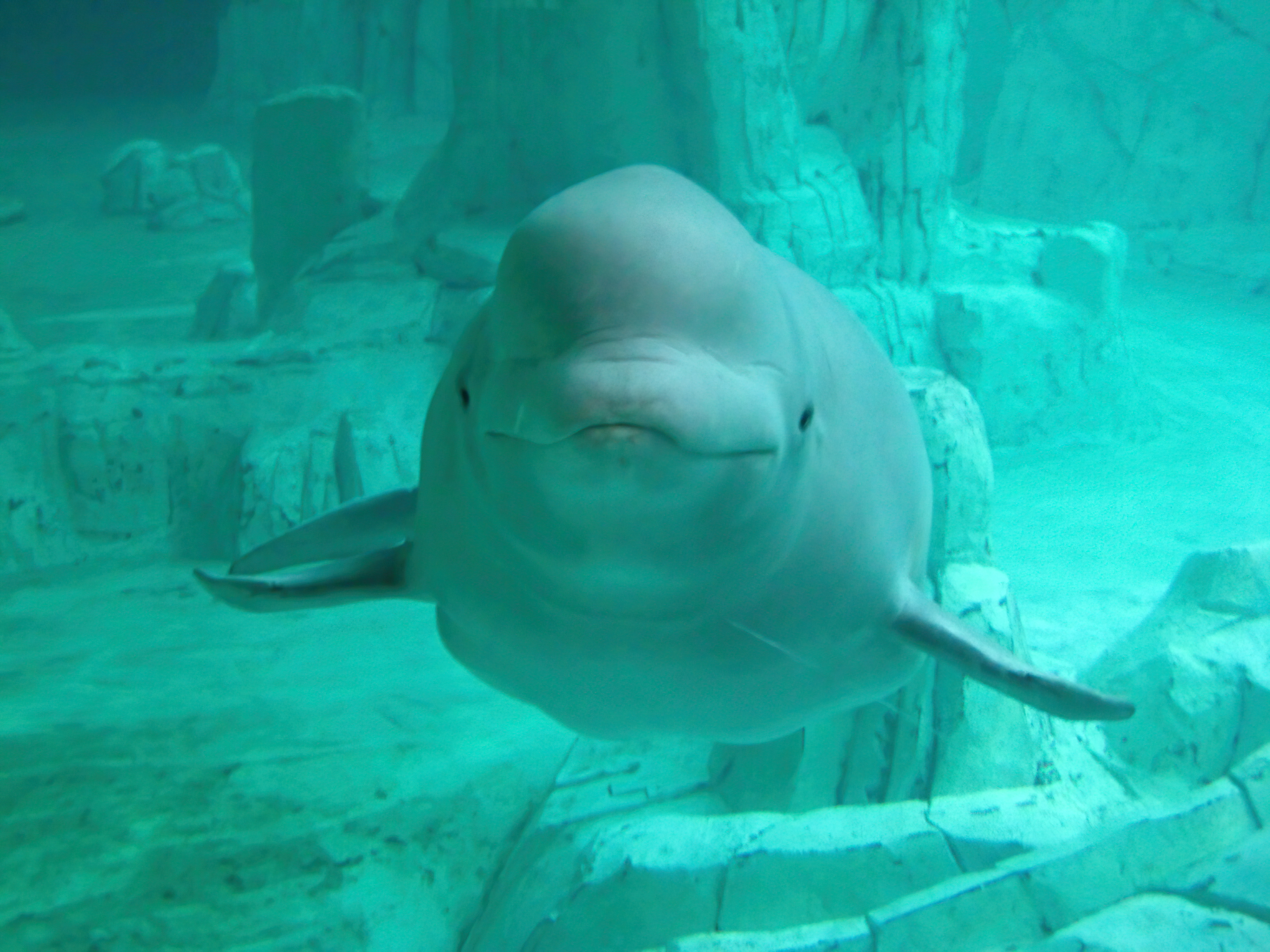
Beluga whale in the arctic tank

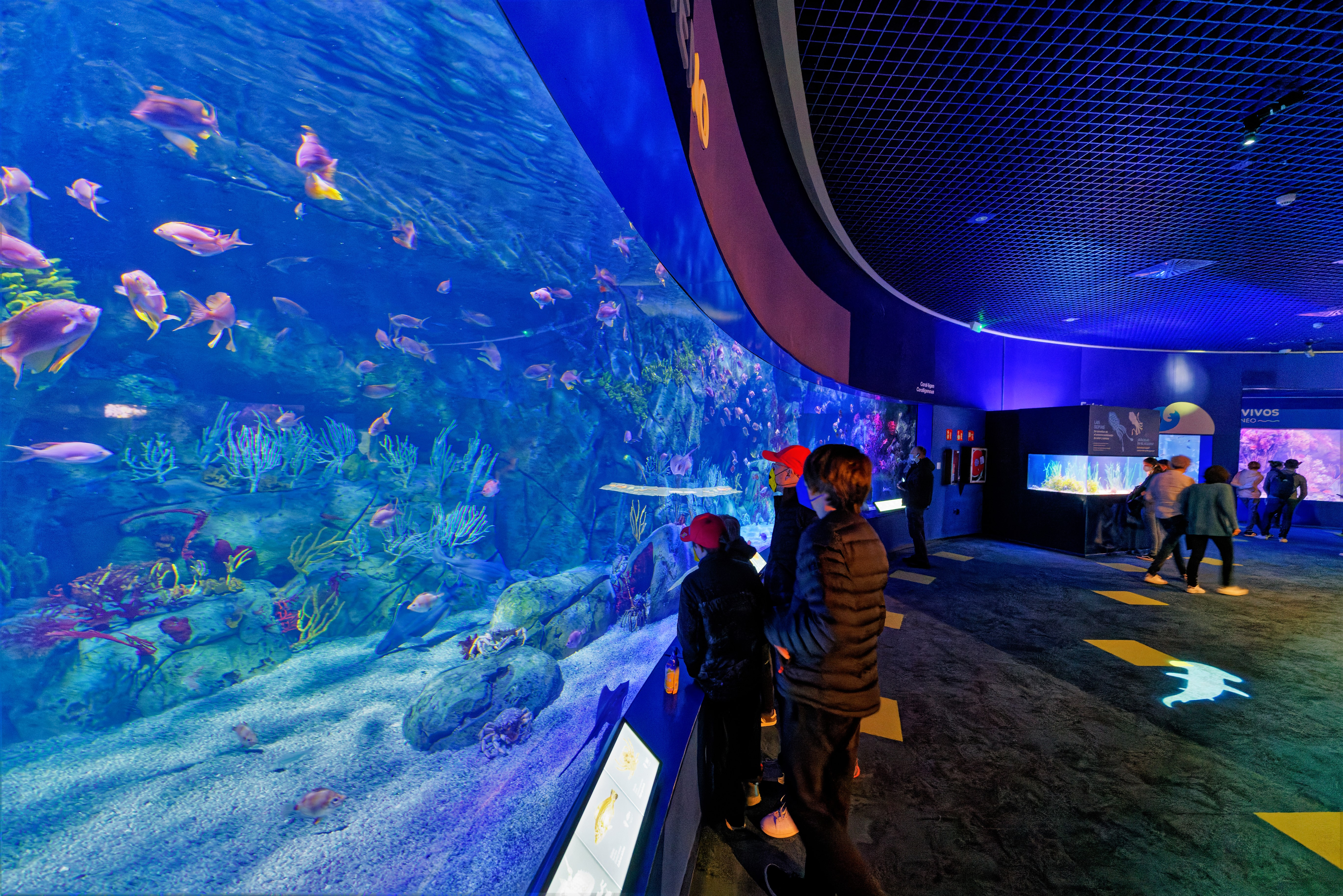

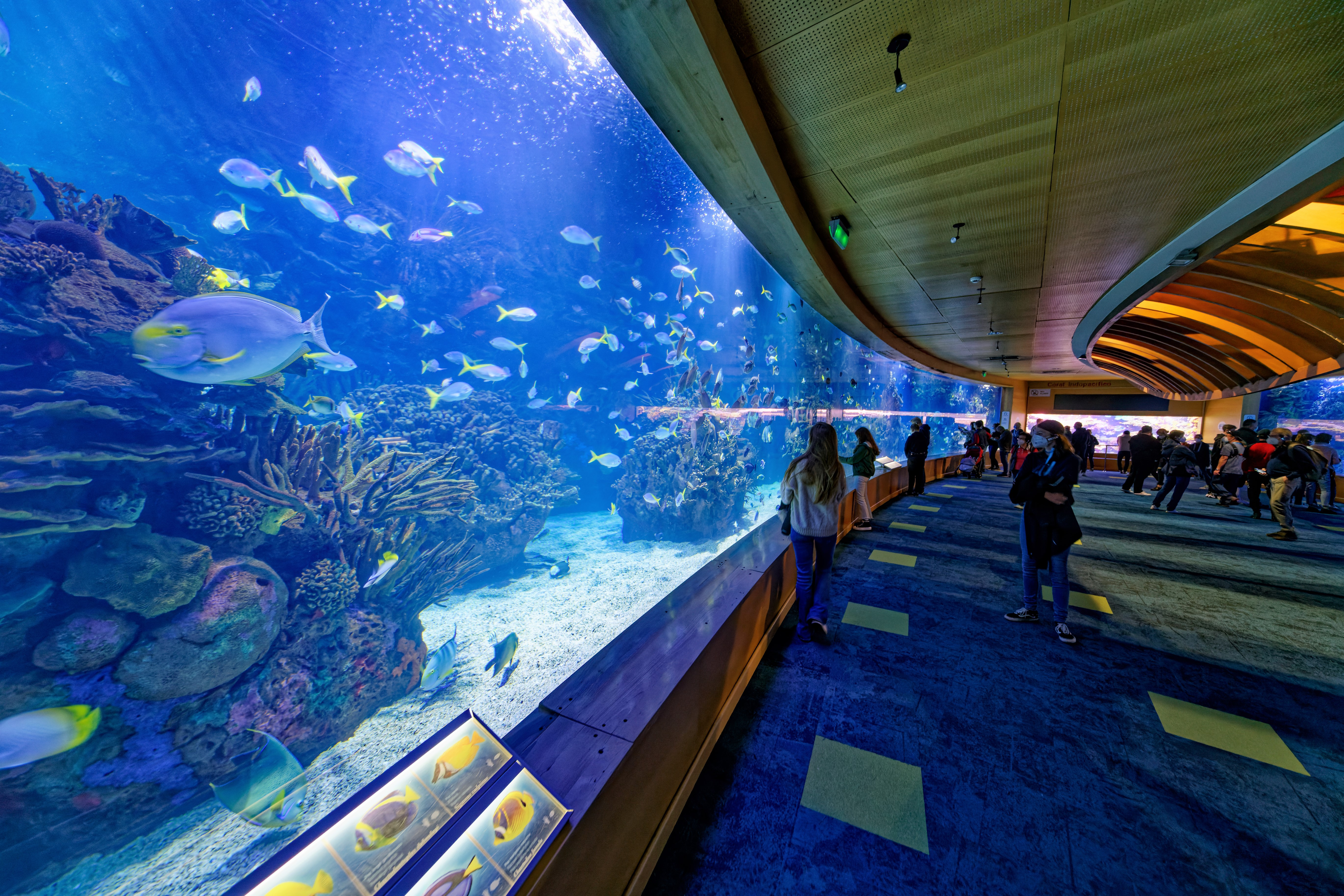

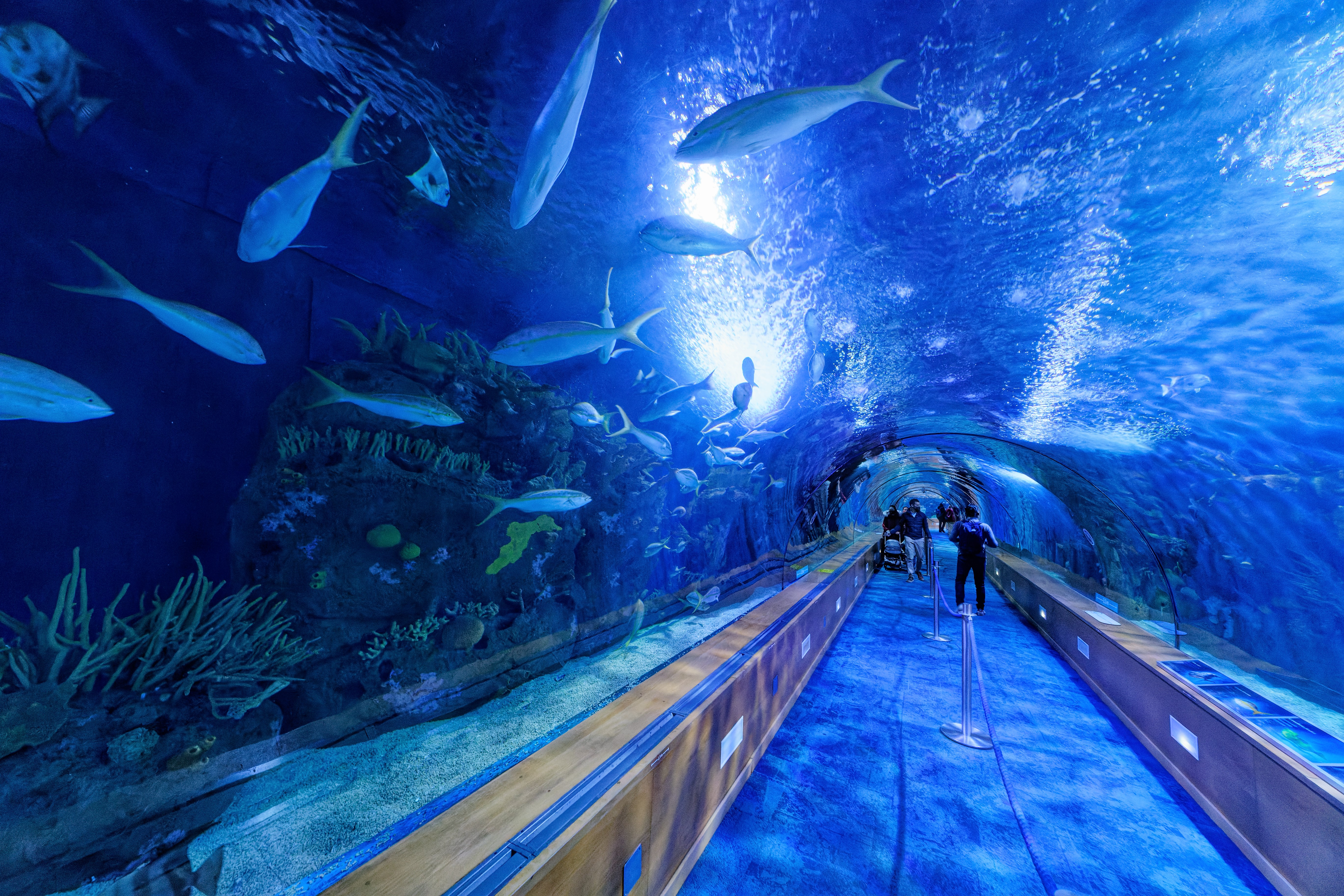

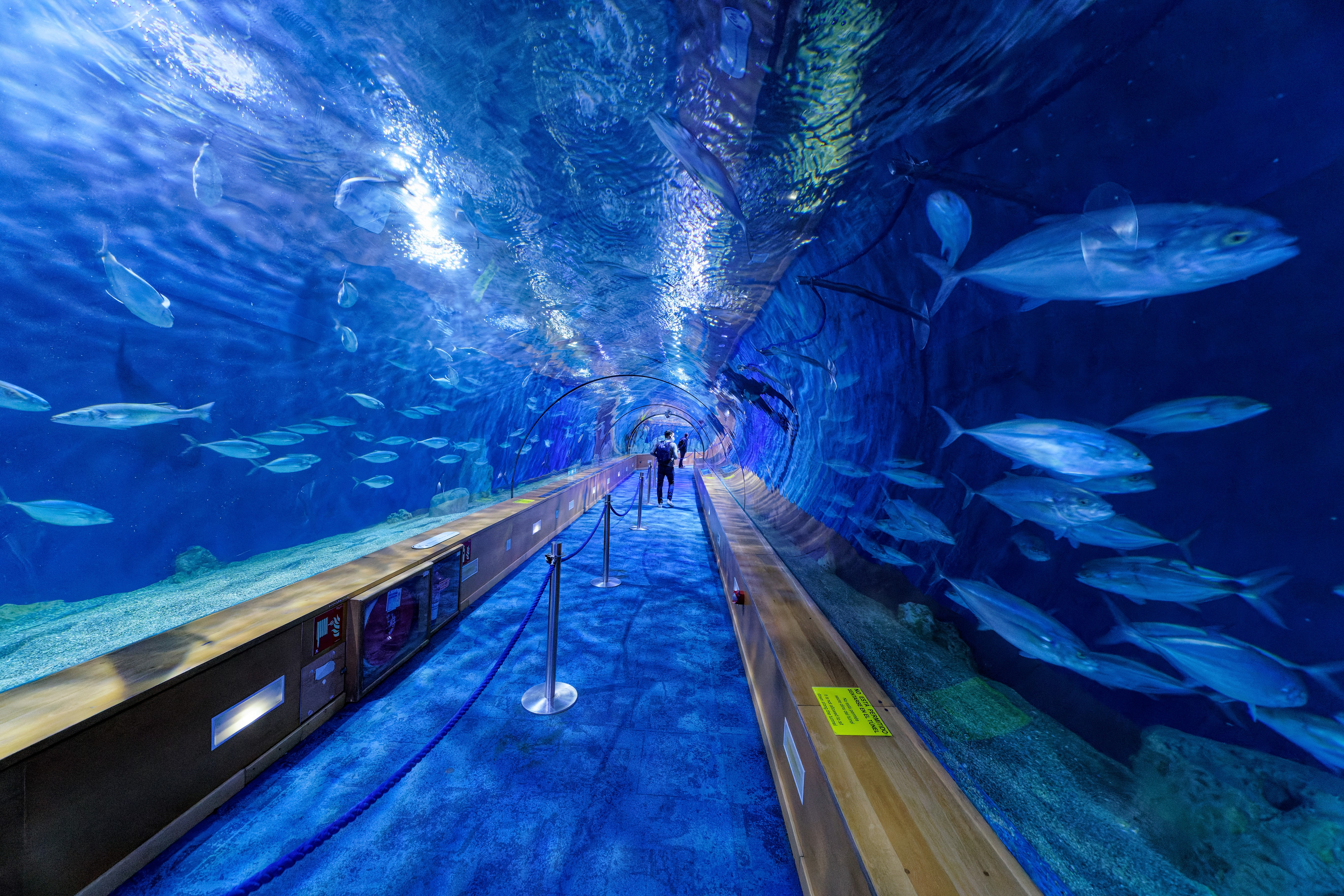

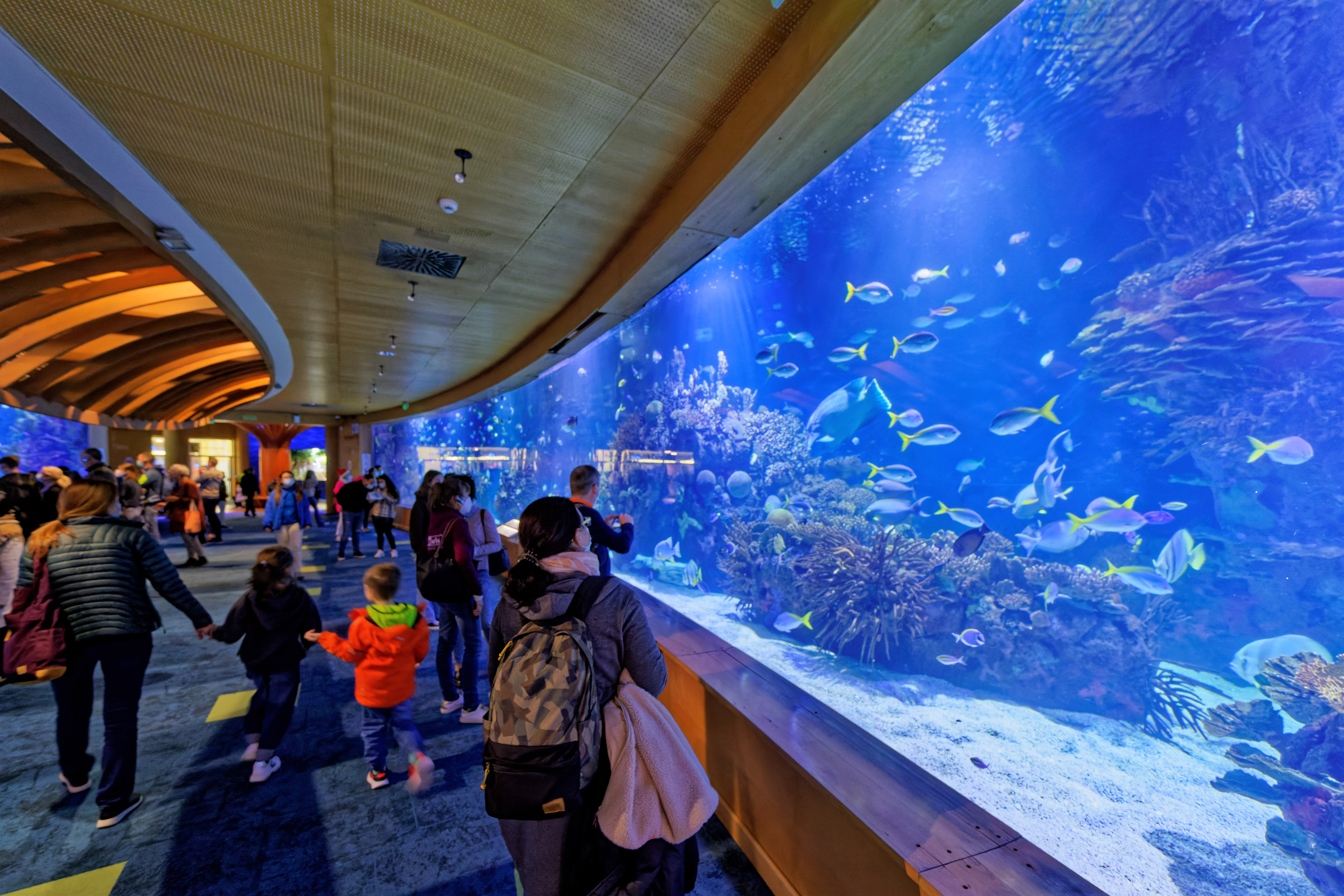

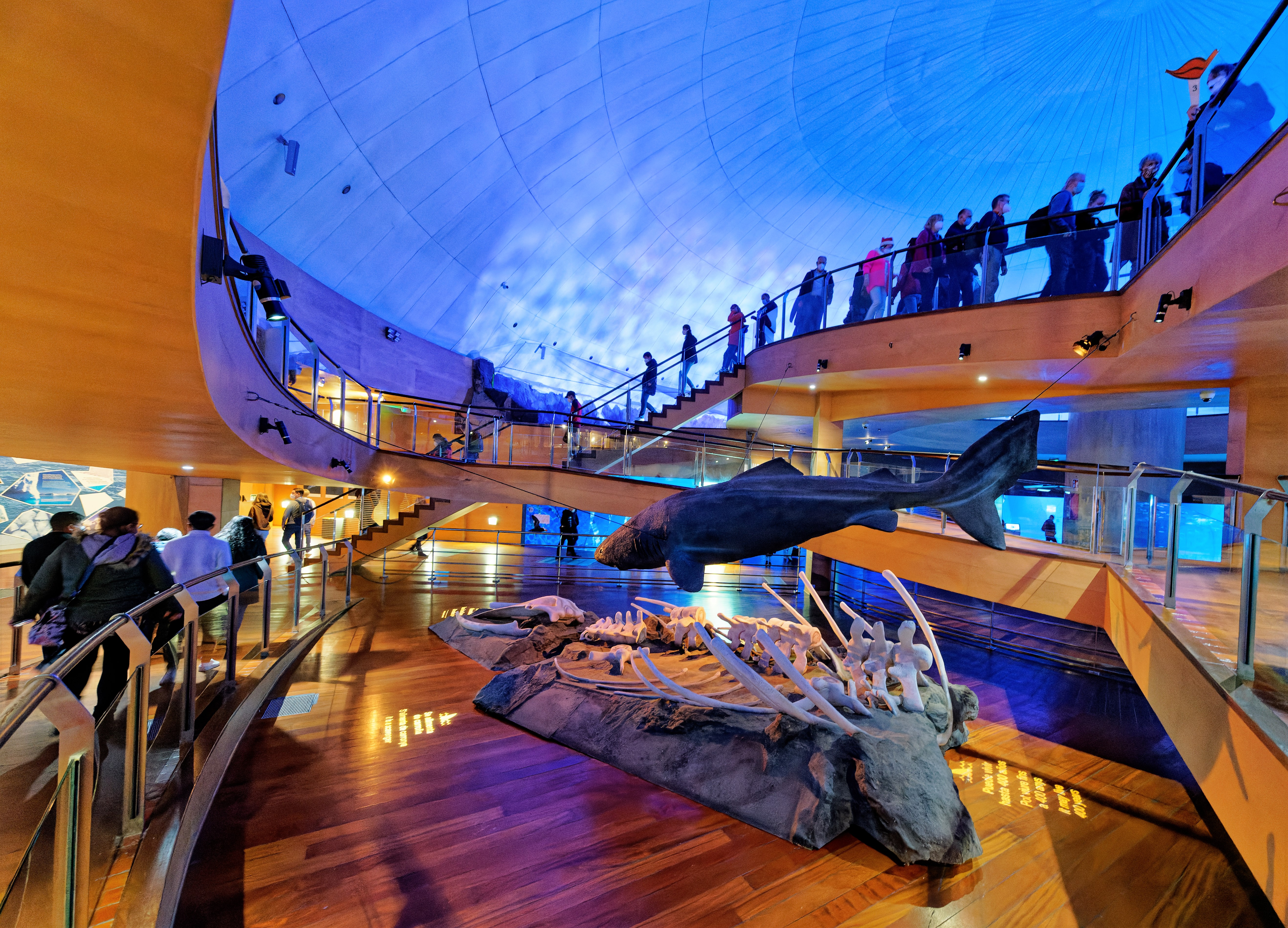

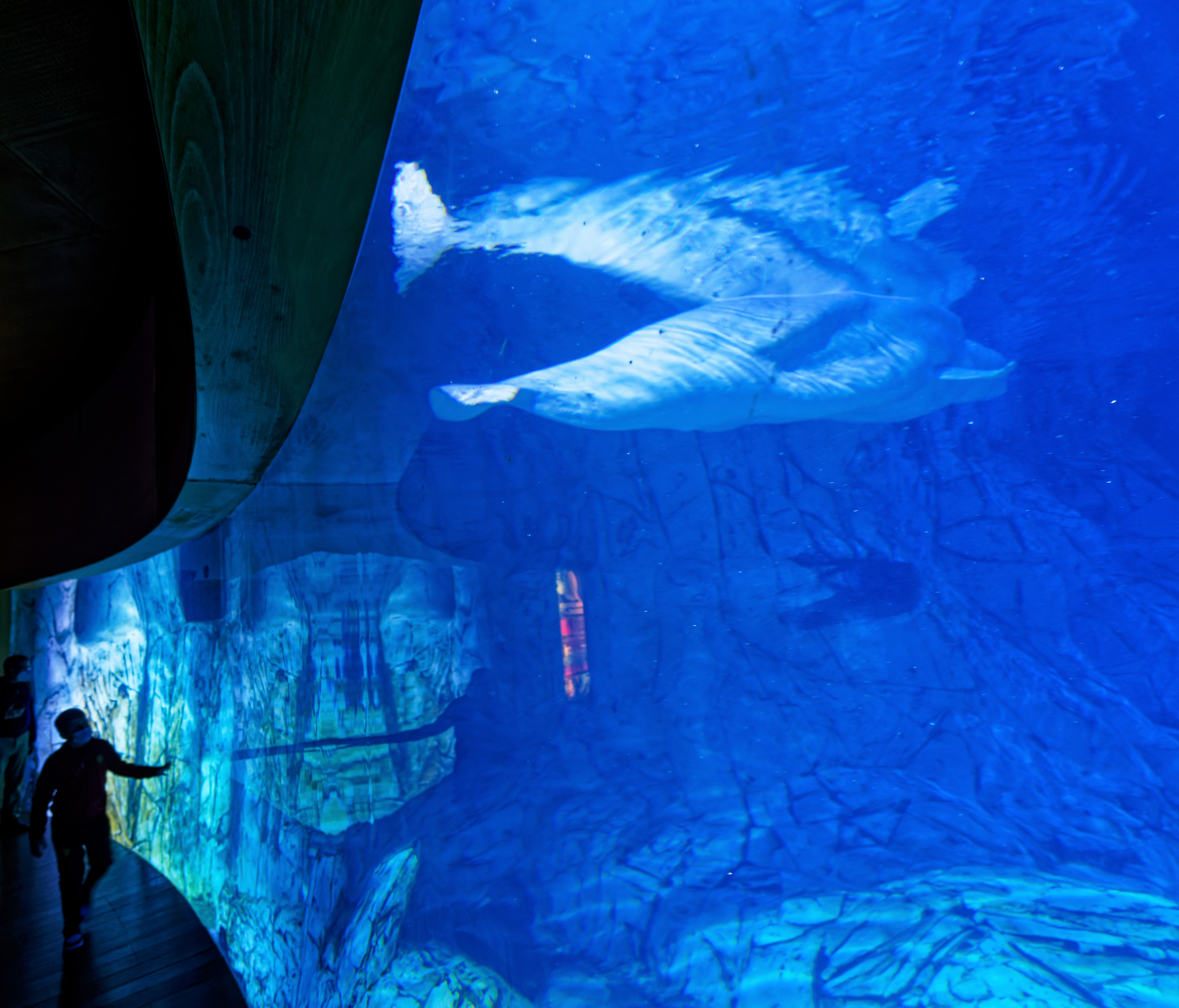

== See also ==
- List of aquaria by country
- List of dolphinariums
