= Horno de Alcedo =

Spanish village

Coordinates: 39.433°N 0.377°W

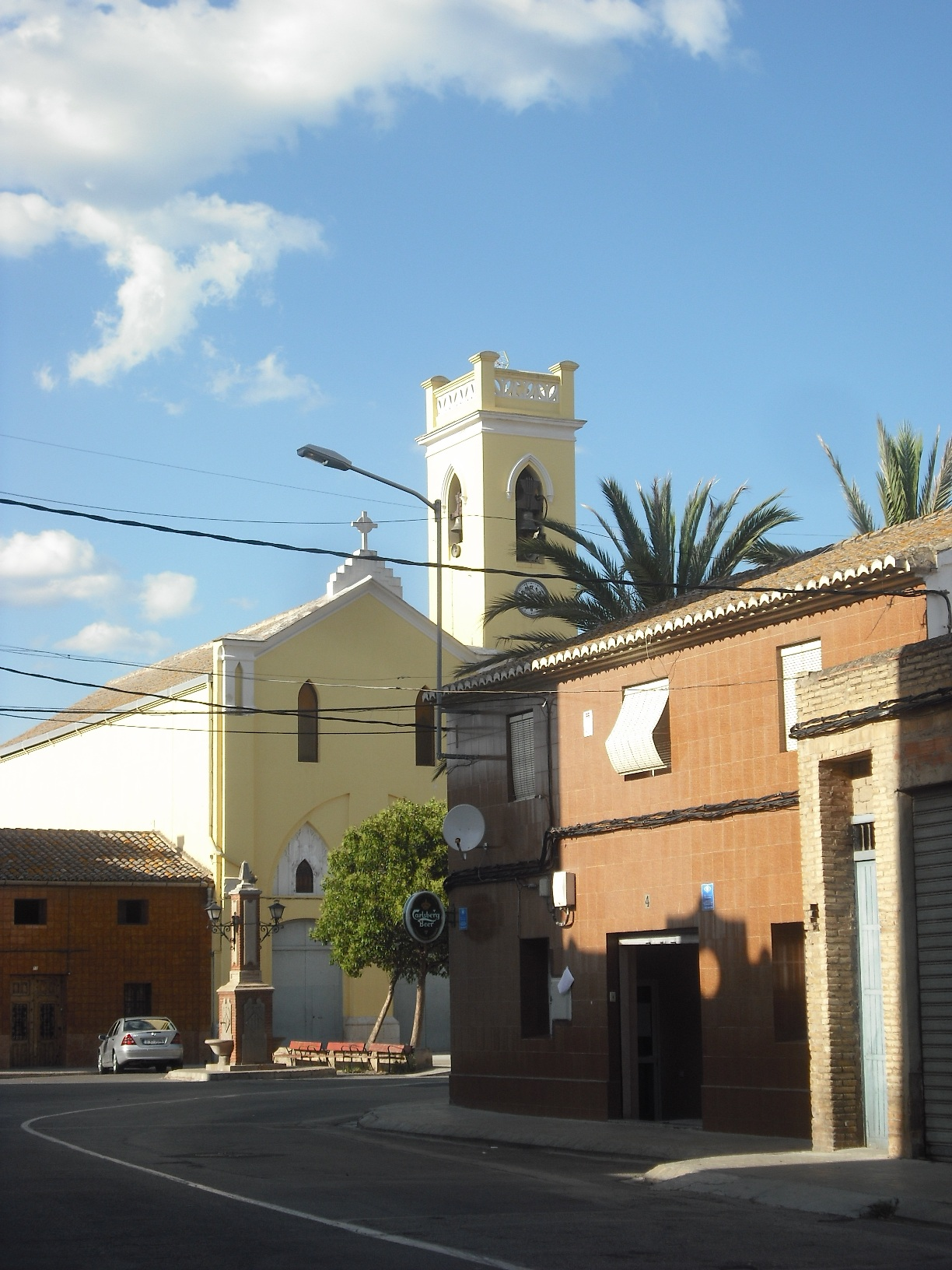

Horno de Alcedo (Valencian: Forn d'Alcedo) is a village in the municipality of Valencia, located in the Pobles del Sud district. Its population was 1,204 in 2017.
