= Solar Decathlon Middle East =

The 2018 edition of the Solar Decathlon Middle East will take place in Dubai, United Arab Emirates.

== Solar Decathlon Middle East 2018 ==
The teams selected to compete in Solar Decathlon Middle East 2018 are:

- United Arab Emirates: Team Aqua Green Ajman University of Science and Technology (United Arab Emirates)
- United Arab Emirates: American University in Dubai (United Arab Emirates)
- United Arab Emirates: American University of Ras AlKhaimah (United Arab Emirates)
- Oman: Dhofar University (Oman)
- Netherlands: Eindhoven University of Technology (Netherlands)
- United Arab Emirates: Heriot-Watt University Dubai (United Arab Emirates)
- Italy: D'Annunzio University of Chieti–Pescara; University of Pisa; Università degli Studi della Campania Luigi Vanvitelli; University of Sassari (Italy)
- Malaysia: Universiti Sains Islam Malaysia - Malaysia; University of Technology – Malaysia (Malaysia)
- Romania, United Arab Emirates: Team EFdeN Signature Ion Mincu University of Architecture and Urbanism; Technical University of Civil Engineering of Bucharest; Birla Institute of Technology and Science, Pilani – Dubai Campus; Politehnica University of Bucharest (Romania-United Arab Emirates)
- Taiwan: National Chiao Tung University (Taiwan)
- Pakistan: National University of Sciences and Technology (Pakistan)
- United Arab Emirates: New York University Abu Dhabi (United Arab Emirates)
- Qatar: Qatar University (Qatar)
- Italy: Sapienza University of Rome (Italy)
- Australia: University of Wollongong (Australia)
- United Arab Emirates: The Petroleum Institute; Zayed University (United Arab Emirates)
- United Arab Emirates, Italy: University of Sharjah; University of Ferrara (United Arab Emirates-Italy)
- France, United Arab Emirates, Palestine: University of Bordeaux; Amity University; An-Najah National University; Arts & Métiers Paris Tech; Bordeaux School of Architecture (France-United Arab Emirates-Palestine)
- United States: Virginia Tech (United States)
- Saudi Arabia: King Saud University (Kingdom of Saudi Arabia)
- Jordan: The University of Jordan (Jordan)
- Serbia: University of Belgrade (Serbia)

== See also ==
- Solar Decathlon
- Solar Decathlon Africa
- Solar Decathlon China
- Solar Decathlon Europe
- Solar Decathlon Latin America and Caribbean
