= Solar Decathlon Europe =

- Locations: Wuppertal, Germany
- Next event: September 2021
- Organiser: Energy Endeavour Foundation & University of Wuppertal
- Website: https://www.solardecathlon.eu

The Solar Decathlon Europe (SDE) is an international student-based Competition that challenges collegiate Teams to design, build and operate highly efficient and innovative buildings powered by renewable energy. The winner of the Competition is the Team able to score the most points in 10 contests.

On Oct. 18, 2007, the Spanish and U.S. governments signed a memorandum of understanding in which the Spanish Ministry of Housing committed to organise and host a Solar Decathlon in Europe. The agreement was signed in Washington, D.C., next to the Universidad Politécnica de Madrid's Casa Solar during the U.S. Department of Energy Solar Decathlon 2007 Competition. The American signatory was Alexander A. Karsner, assistant secretary of the Office of Energy Efficiency and Renewable Energy Department of the U.S. Department of Energy, with Fernando Magro Fernández, undersecretary of housing of the Ministry of Housing representing the Spanish government.

== Solar Decathlon Europe 2010 ==
Modeled after the U.S. Department of Energy Solar Decathlon, the first Solar Decathlon Europe took place in Madrid, Spain, in June 2010. Decathletes from 17 Teams spent 10 days competing in the Villa Solar near the Royal Palace of Madrid (Palacio Real). A combination of task completion, measurement, and jury scoring determined Solar Decathlon Europe's first champion: Virginia Polytechnic Institute and State University with Lumenhaus project.

Final results:

Rank	Country	Team/House	University	Total points
1	United States	Lumenhaus	Virginia Polytechnic Institute and State University, United States	812
2	Germany	Team Ikaros	Rosenheim University of Applied Sciences, Germany	811
3	Germany	home+	Stuttgart Technology University of Applied Sciences	808
4	France	Armadillo Box	Ecole National Supérieure d'architecture de Grenoble	794
5	Finland	Luukku	Helsinki University of Technology	777
6	Germany	Team Wuppertal	University of Wuppertal, Germany	773
7	France	Napevomo	Arts et Métiers ParisTech	763
8	United States	RE:FOCUS	University of Florida	743
9	Spain	SMLhouse	CEU Cardinal Herrera University	737
10	Germany	LIVINGEQUIA	HTW Berlin Hochschule für Technik und Wirtschaft Berlin, Germany	729
11	China	Bambu House	Tongji University, Shanghai, China	683
12	Spain	Solarkit	University of Seville, Spain	678
13	Spain	Low3	Polytechnic University of Catalonia, Barcelona, Spain	668
14	Spain	La Envolvente del Urcomante	University of Valladolid, Spain	648
15	United Kingdom	H.O.U.S.E	University of Nottingham, United Kingdom	641
16	China	Sunflower	Tianjin University, Tianjin, China	585
17	Spain	Fab Lab House	Institute for Advanced Architecture of Catalonia, Barcelona, Spain	583

== Solar Decathlon Europe 2012 ==
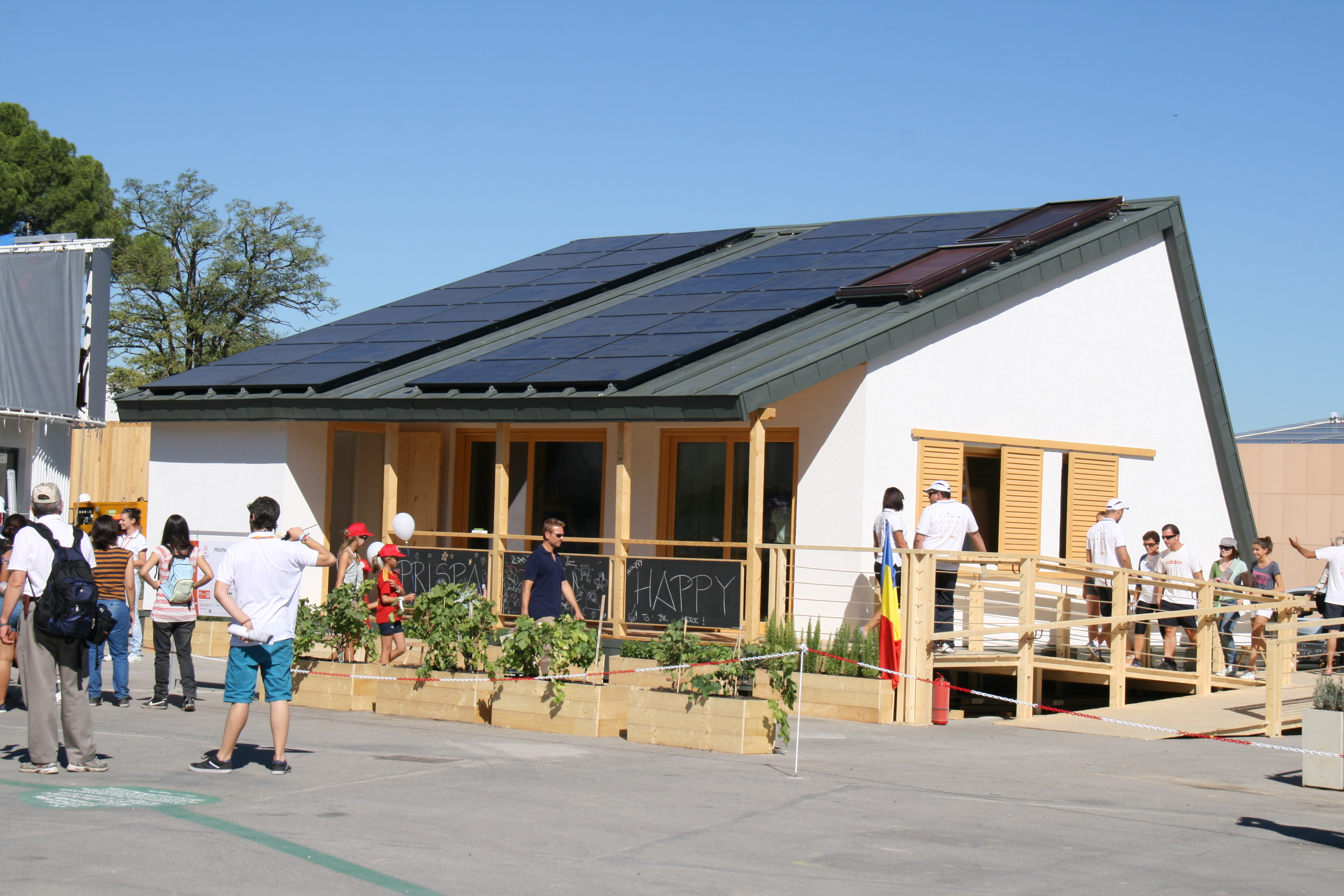
Romanian Team at Solar Decathlon 2012, Team PRISPA

Second edition of the Solar Decathlon Europe was held from Sept. 14–30, 2012, in Madrid, Spain in the Casa de Campo. The final standings of its 18 competitors were:

Rank	Country	Team/House	University	Total points
1	France	Rhône Alpes/Canopea	École Nationale Supérieure d'Architecture de Grenoble (France)	908.72
2	Spain	Andalucía Team/Patio 2.12	Universidades de Sevilla, Jaén, Granada, and Málaga (Spain)	897.39
3	Italy	Med in Italy	Universitá Degli Studi di Roma Tre, Sapienza Universitá di Roma, Free University of Bozen, and Fraunhofer Italy (Italy)	863.49
4	Germany	ECOLAR	University of Applied Sciences Konstanz (Germany)	835
5	Germany	RWTH Aachen University	RWTH Aachen University (Germany)	819.31
6	Hungary	Odooproject/Odoo	Budapest University of Technology and Economics (Hungary)	766.98
7	Spain	CEU Team Valencia/SML System	Universidad CEU Cardenal Herrera (Spain)	765.98
8	Spain	(e)co Team/ (e)co	Universitat Politécnica de Catalunya (Spain)	731.57
9	Romania	Team PRISPA	"Ion Mincu" University of Architecture and Urbanism, Technical University of Civil Engineering of Bucharest, and Politehnica University of Bucharest (Romania)	719.16
10	Denmark	Team DTU/Fold	Technical University of Denmark (Denmark)	715.59
11	China	Tongji Team/Para EcoHouse	Tongji University, Shanghai, China	686.88
12	Spain	EHU Team/Ekohouse	Universidad del País Vasco – Euskal Herriko Unibertsitatea (Spain)	684.20
13	France	Aquitaine Bordeaux Campus/Sumbiosi	Bordeaux University (France)	674.80
14	Brazil	Team Brasil/Ekó House	Universidade Federal de Santa Catarina and Universidade de São Paulo (Brazil)	670.99
15	Japan	Chiba University/The Omotenashi House	Chiba University (Japan)	641.91
16	Portugal	cem+nem-/cem’ casas em movimento	Universidade do Porto (Portugal)	538.29
17	France, Italy	Astonyshine Team/ Astonyshine	Ecole Nationale Supérieure d'Architecture Paris – Malaquais, Universitá di Ferrara, Ecole des Ponts Paristech, and Politecnico di Bari (France-Italy)	416.49
18	Spain	Universidad de Zaragoza Team/Pi House	Universidad de Zaragoza (Spain)	371.48

== Solar Decathlon Europe 2014 ==
Solar Decathlon Europe 2014 took place in Versailles, France, June 28–July 14, 2014.

Official final results:

Rank	Country	Team	University	Total points
1	Italy	Team Rhome4 DenCity	Roma Tre University, Italy	840.63
2	France	Team Atlantic Challenge	ENSA Nantes, ESB, Audencia Group, Audencia Nantes, École des mines de Nantes, ISSBA, IUT Nantes, Architectes Ingénieurs Associés, Atlansun, Institut des Matériaux Jean Rouxel, Medieco, Novabuild, SAMOA, and SCE	839.75
3	Netherlands	Team Prêt-à-Loger	Delft University of Technology (Netherlands)	837.87
4	Germany	Team Rooftop	University of the Arts Berlin and Technische Universität Berlin (Germany)	823.42
5	Switzerland	Team Lucerne-Suisse	Lucerne University of Applied Sciences and Arts – School of Engineering and Architecture (Switzerland)	804.75
6	France Chile	Team FENIX - UTFSM	Universidad Técnica Federico Santa María, Valparaiso (Chile) and University of La Rochelle – Espace Bois de l'IUT (France)	802.42
7	Germany	Team OnTop	Frankfurt University of Applied Sciences (Germany)	793.71
8	Denmark	Team DTU	Technical University of Denmark (Denmark)	780.01
9	France United States	Team Reciprocite	University of Angers and Appalachian State University	776.92
10	Spain	Team Barcelona Tech 2014	Universitat Politecnica de Catalunya, Barcelona (Spain)	776.24
11	Japan	Team Chiba University Japan	Chiba University (Japan)	774.09
12	Taiwan	Team NCTU - UNICODE	National Yang Ming Chiao Tung University (Taiwan)	772.15
13	Mexico	Team MEXICO	National Autonomous University of Mexico and the Center of Research in Industrial Design and the School of Engineering and the School of Arts (Mexico)	760.17
14	United States Germany	Team Inside out	Rhode Island School of Design, Rhode Island (U.S.A.), Brown University, Rhode Island (U.S.A.), and University of Applied Sciences – Erfurt (Germany)	657.46
15	Spain	Team Plateau	University of Alcalá and University of Castilla-La Mancha, Madrid (Spain)	650.44
16	Costa Rica	Team TEC	Costa Rica Institute of Technology, Cartago (Costa Rica)	588.8
17	Thailand	Team Kmutt	King Mongkut's University of Technology Thonburi, (Thailand)	508.15
18	India	Team SHUNYA	Academy of Architecture and Indian Institute of Technology Bombay (India)	452.3
19	Romania	Team EFdeN	Technical University of Civil Engineering of Bucharest, Politehnica University of Bucharest, and Ion Mincu University of Architecture and Urbanism, (Romania)	348.49
20	France	Team UPE	University of Paris-Est, ENSA Paris Malaquais, ENSA Marne la Vallée, ESTP Paris, École des ponts ParisTech, ESIEE Paris, ENSG, and French institute of science and technology for transport, spatial planning, development and networks (France)	268.81

And substitute Teams:

- Croatia: University of Zagreb / Team UniZG
- Italy: Politecnico di Torino / Team Sunslice
- Denmark Spain: VIA University College / Universitat Jaume I / équipe VIA-UJI
- Romania: Politehnica University of Timișoara / West University of Timișoara / upTIM

== Solar Decathlon Europe after 2014 and the Energy Enedeavour Foundation ==
After the Solar Decathlon Europe in 2014, previous organisers, participants, supporters and decathletes worked to create a vehicle for the longevity of the Solar Decathlon in Europe. The culmination of this work was the creation of the Energy Endeavour Foundation (EEF) in 2016/2017 with the endorsement of the United States Department of Energy to steward the Solar Decathlon in Europe. The EEF subsequently issued a Call for Cities for the 2019 edition, which was awarded to Szentendre, Hungary in March 2017.

From this point onward the Energy Endeavour Foundation has fulfilled its stewarding role to the SDE editions organisers. Drawing upon the input of the SDE Council of Experts, the EEF provides continuity from one SDE edition to the next.

== Solar Decathlon Europe 2019 ==
Solar Decathlon Europe 2019 took place in Szentendre, Hungary, July 12–July 28, 2019.

Official results:

Rank	Country	Team	University	Total points
1	France	Team Habiter 2030	École nationale supérieure d'architecture et de paysage de Lille, France	853.483
2	Netherlands	Team MOR	Delft University of Technology (Netherlands)	851.791
3	Romania	Team Over4	Technical University of Civil Engineering of Bucharest, Romania	802.501
4	Belgium	The Mobble	Ghent University, Belgium	794.683
5	Hungary	Team Someshine	University of Miskolc, Hungary	755.957
6	Spain	Azalea	Polytechnic University of Valencia, Spain	744.471
7	Thailand	Resilient Nest	King Mongkut's University of Technology Thonburi, Thailand	733.974
8	Spain	Team TO	Polytechnic University of Catalonia, Spain	717.966
9	Hungary	Team Koeb	Budapest University of Technology and Economics, Hungary	696.416
10	Spain	Proyecto AURA	Universitat Politecnica de Catalunya, Barcelona (Spain)	691.556

== Solar Decathlon Europe 2021/2022 ==
In July 2018 the Energy Endeavour Foundation (EEF) issued the Call for Cities for the 2021 edition of the Solar Decathlon Europe (SDE21). In early 2019, the EEF designated the city of Wuppertal, Germany, as the host city for the SDE21, led by a team from the University of Wuppertal and the Wuppertal Institute for Climate, Environment and Energy. Due to the COVID19 health crisis the Solar Decathlon Europe 2021 was postponed, and took between June 10 and June 26, 2022. The SDE21>22 took place on the Utopiastadt Campus. Utopiastadt participated in the "Solar Decathlon goes urban" concept of the 2021 competition.

The SDE21 Call for Teams was open until October 25, 2019, leading to the selection of 18 Teams from 11 countries. This edition of the SDE focuses on the requalification of urban environments, challenging the participating Teams in resolving one of three possible urban solutions: renovation and extension, closing gaps, and addition of stories.

The Teams that competed in the SDE21>22 were:

- France, Grenoble, Grenoble School of Architecture, Team AuRA.
- Spain, Valencia, Polytechnic University of Valencia, Azalea.
- Sweden, Gothenburg, Chalmers University of Technology, C-hive.
- Germany, Stuttgart, Stuttgart University of Applied Sciences, Collab.
- Turkey / Germany, Istanbul / Lübeck, Istanbul Technical University / Lübeck Technical University of Applied Sciences, Deeply High.
- Romania, Bucharest, Ion Mincu University of Architecture and Urban Planning, EFdeN.
- Czech Republic, Prague, Czech Technical University in Prague, FIRSTlife.
- Taiwan, Taipei, National Chiao Tung University, House for all.
- Germany, Rosenheim, Rosenheim Technical University of Applied Sciences, Level Up.
- Germany, Aachen, FH Aachen, Local+.
- Hungary, Pécs, University of Pécs, Lungs of the City.
- Germany, Düsseldorf, Hochschule Düsseldorf, Mi-Mo.
- Germany, Karlsruhe, Karlsruhe Institute of Technology, RoofKit.
- Netherlands, Delft, Delft University of Technology, SUM.
- Netherlands, Eindhoven, Eindhoven University of Technology, Virtu/e.
- Germany, Biberach, Biberach University of Applied Science, X4s.

Two Teams from Bangkok, Thailand, SAB from Bangkok University and Ur-Baan from King Mongkut's University of Technology Thonburi were unable to participate onsite due to high transportation costs.

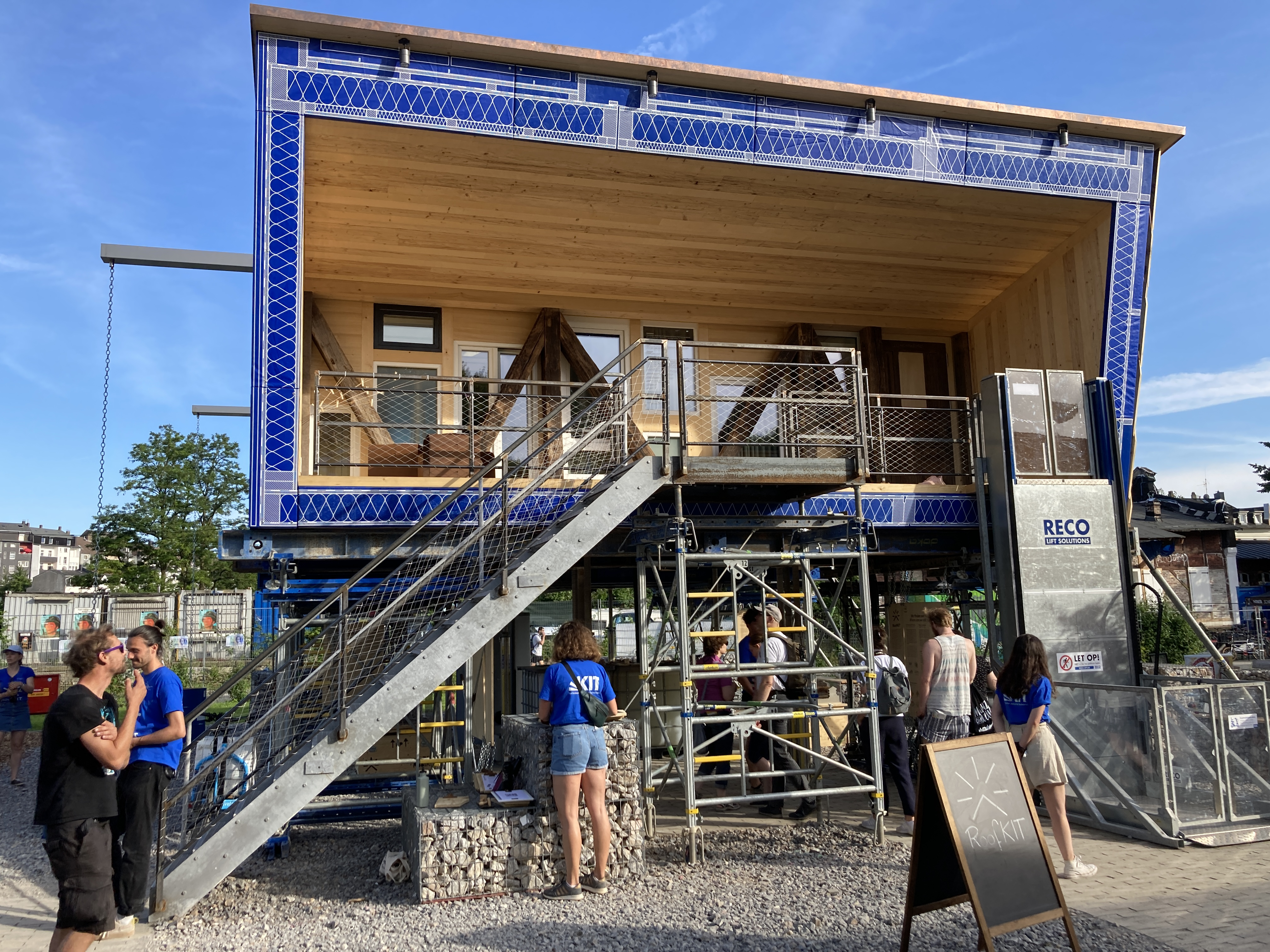
Winning project of the SDE22, Team Roofkit

Final ranking

1. Platz: Team RoofKIT, Karlsruhe Institute of Technology

2. Platz: Team VIRTUe, Eindhoven University of Technology

3. Platz (draw): Team SUM, Delft University of Technology und Team AuRA, Grenoble National School of Architecture

A 2024 study of the 16 houses that completed the competition, using 34 distinct technologies, found that all teams used solar panels. The study concludes that sustainability performance depends on the combination of the technologies rather than how many were used.

== Solar Decathlon Europe 2023 ==
The Call for Cities for the Solar Decathlon Europe 2023 (available here: sde23_ Call for Cities and… webinar! – SDE) was launched on July 14, 2020, by the Energy Endeavour Foundation. On April 7, 2021, the Capital City of Romania, Bucharest was designed as Host City for the SDE23.

In January 2022, through a joint decision between The Energy Endeavour Foundation (governing body of the Solar Decathlon Europe) and the Solar Decathlon Bucharesti Association, EFdeN, (SDE23 Host City Executives) the SDE23 edition was closed.

The Closure was a result of continued repercussions caused by the COVID pandemic, which created high uncertainty and volatility, with ensuing economic, social, and public health challenges.

== See also ==
- Solar Decathlon
- Solar Decathlon Africa
- Solar Decathlon China
- Solar Decathlon Middle East
- Solar Decathlon Latin America and Caribbean
