= Solar Hero =

Solar
- Directed by: Matt Keay
- Written by: Matt Keay; Sylvester Ndumbi
- Produced by: Matt Keay; Sylvester Ndumbi
- Starring: Matt Beck; Mark Blackwell; Whitney Nordstrom; Turc Harmesynn; Tang Lee; Simon Knight; Gordon Howell; David Keith; Glenn Murcutt
- Narrated by: Bill Mondy
- Cinematography: Scott Keay; Matt Keay; Sylvester Ndumbi; Jackson Tyler Richardson; David Copithorne
- Edited by: Elias Hope
- Music by: Any Sun & Beach Audio
- Production company: Business on Camera (BOC)
- Distributed by: Shaw Media, Shaw TV
- Release date: February 1, 2012
- Running time: 44 minutes
- Country: Canada
- Language: English
- Budget: $190,000 (Canadian dollars)

Solar Hero is a 2012 Canadian documentary film directed by Matt Keay. The documentary follows Team Alberta (Alberta Solar Decathlon Project) as they journey to in the 2009 US DOE Solar Decathlon Competition in Washington, DC in October 2009.

== See also ==
- Alberta Solar Decathlon Project
- 2009 US DOE Solar Decathlon Competition
- Solar energy
