= Solar Decathlon Africa =

Solar Decathlon AFRICA
- Locations: Ben Guerir, Morocco
- Organiser: UM6P and IRESEN
- Website: www.solardecathlonafrica.com

The Solar Decathlon AFRICA is an international competition that challenges collegiate teams to design and build houses powered exclusively by the sun. The winner of the competition is the team that is able to score the most points in ten contests.

On November 15, 2016, the Moroccan Ministry of Energy, Mines, Water, and Sustainable development; the Moroccan Research Institute for Solar Energy and New Energies (IRESEN); and the United States Department of Energy signed a memorandum of understanding to collaborate on the development of Solar Decathlon Africa, a competition that will integrate unique local and regional characteristics while following the philosophy, principles, and model of the U.S. Department of Energy Solar Decathlon. The competition is planned for September 2019.

This competition takes place during even years, alternating with the U.S.-based competition, Solar Decathlon by agreement between the United States and Moroccan governments.

== Solar Decathlon Africa 2019 ==
The 2019 edition of the Solar Decathlon Africa will take place in Ben Guerir, Morocco

Participants:

No.	Country	Team name	Universities
1	Romania	TEAM Modularity	Politehnica University of Bucharest, Romania; Technical University of Civil Engineering of Bucharest, Romania
2	Morocco United States	Inter House Team	Colorado School of Mines, Golden, Colorado, United States of America; National School of Architecture - Marrakech (ENAM), Marrakech, Morocco; Cadi Ayyad University, Marrakech, Morocco
3	Morocco Malaysia	TEAM A’ Free Home	National School of Architecture Fez - Morocco; Universiti Sains Islam Malaysia; EMDD of Ecole supérieure de Technologie de Salé – Morocco; DESTEC of Faculté des Lettres et Sciences Humaines – Morocco
4	Morocco France	TEAM Africa Golden Riad	Ecole supérieure de Technologie de Fes- Morocco; University of Pau and Pays de l'Adour, Pau, France
5	Morocco Senegal	TEAM Bayt-Akhdar	Université Sultan Moulay Slimane, Beni Mellal, Morocco; Cheikh Anta Diop University, Dakar, Senegal
6	Morocco	TEAM TADD-ART	Université Mundiapolis, Casablanca, Morocco; Academy of Traditional Art, Casablanca, Morocco
7	Morocco United States Nigeria	Team OCULUS	Worcester Polytechnic Institute, Worcester, Massachusetts, United States of America; ENSIAS, Rabat, Morocco; ENSAM, Meknes, Morocco; African University of Science and Technology, Abuja – Nigeria
8	Morocco France	TEAM PLUG & LIVE	Université privée de Fès, Morocco; EPF Ecole D’INGENIEUR-E- S – France
9	Morocco Germany	TEAM SUNIMPLANT	National School of Architecture Tetouan-Morocco; École nationale des sciences appliquées de Tétouan, Tetouan – Morocco; fr:École nationale de commerce et de gestion de Tanger, Tangier - Morocco; Fraunhofer Center for Silicon Photovoltaics CSP, Halle, Saxony-Anhalt, Germany; ADRAR NOUH cooperative
10	Morocco	TEAM TDART	Abdelmalek Essaâdi University, Tetuan, Morocco
11	Morocco	TEAM THRIVE	Mohammadia School of Engineering, Rabat, Morocco
12	Morocco	TEAM CJEM	ECOLE HASSANIA DES TRAVAUX PUBLICS, Morocco; INSTITUT SUPÉRIEUR DU COMMERCE ET L'ADMINISTRATION DES ENTREPRISES, Morocco; EMINES-SCHOOL OF INDUSTRIAL MANAGEMENT, Morocco
13	South Africa	TEAM Mahali	Stellenbosch University, Stellenbosch, South Africa
14	Morocco Germany Senegal Italy France	TEAM Afrikataterre	Université Internationale de Rabat, Morocco; University of Applied Sciences/Technische Hochschule Lübeck, Germany; Academic Institutions of DAKAR (CUAD/IPP/CSFP-BTP), Senegal; Région de Rabat-Salé-Kénitra; Université_Ibn-Tofail, Kenitra, Morocco; Mohammed V University, Rabat, Morocco; School of architecture of Nancy, France; University of Parma, Italy
15	Morocco United States India Mali Burkina Faso	TEAM E-CO- Dar	University of Hassan II Casablanca, Morocco; National School of Architecture Rabat – Morocco; University of Seattle, Seattle, United States; Faculty of Science Rabat– Morocco; Avinashilingam University, Tamil Nadu, India; Centre Universitaire, technique et professionnel & Centre de recherche pour l’exécution des matériaux, Bamako - Mali; Ecole supérieure de technologie – Morocco; University Ouaga I Joseph Ki-Zerbo Ouagadougou – Burkina Faso; Ecole Nationale des sciences appliquées Kenitra – Morocco
16	Algeria Cameroon Tanzania Democratic Republic of the Congo	TEAM Jua Jamii	Université Abou Bekr Belkaid Tlemcen Pan-African University of Water and Energy Sciences
17	Turkey	TEAM BOSPHOROUS	Yıldız Technical University, Turkey; Istanbul Technical University, Turkey; Istanbul Kültür University, Turkey
18	Morocco United States Egypt	TEAM DarnaSol	Al Akhawayn University, Ifrane, Morocco; University of Maryland, Maryland, United States; Helwan University, Helwan, Egypt
19	Morocco	TEAM SOLARTIGMI	Ecole Marocaine des Sciences de l’Ingénieur-Morocco
20	Morocco	TEAM Solar-ution	Moulay Ismail University, Meknes, Morocco

== Contests ==
1. Architecture
2. Engineering and Construction
3. Market Appeal
4. Comfort Conditions
5. Appliances
6. Sustainability
7. Home life and entertainment
8. Communication and Social Awareness
9. Electrical Energy and Balance
10. Innovation

== See also ==
- Solar Decathlon
- Solar Decathlon China
- Solar Decathlon Europe
- Solar Decathlon Middle East
- Solar Decathlon Latin America and Caribbean
