= Solar Decathlon China =

2018 international competition held in Dezhou, China

The Solar Decathlon China (SDC) is a cooperative student competition in China focused on the design and construction of sustainable housing. It was instituted in 2011 during the Strategic Economic Dialogue between China and the United States. Competitions took place in 2013, 2018 and 2022.

== Solar Decathlon China 2018 ==
The 2018 edition took place in Dezhou, in the province of Shandong.

The top finishers were:

1. China, Italy: South China University of Technology and Polytechnic University of Turin
2. China: Tsinghua University
3. There was a tie for the 3rd place with China, Germany: Southeast University and Technical University of Braunschweig being on par with China, France: Shandong University, Xiamen University, National Institute of Applied Sciences of Rennes, University of Rennes 1/Superior School of Engineering of Rennes, University of Rennes 2/Institute of Management and Urbanism of Rennes, High School Joliot Curie of Rennes, Technical School of Compagnons du Devoir of Rennes, European Academy of Art in Brittany (EESAB), National School of Architecture of Brittany

The other participating teams were:

- China: Beijing Jiaotong University
- China: The University of Hong Kong
- Israel: College of Management Academic Studies (COMAS) Afeka College
- Canada: McGill University and Concordia University
- China, United States: New Jersey Institute of Technology and Fujian University of Technology
- India: Indian Institute of Technology Bombay
- China: Shenyang Institute of Engineering
- China, United States: Shanghai Jiaotong University and University of Illinois at Urbana-Champaign
- China: Hunan University
- South Korea: Seoul National University, Sung Kyun Kwan University, AJOU University
- China: Shanghai University of Engineering Science
- China, Germany: Tongji University and Technical University of Darmstadt
- Canada: University of Toronto, Ryerson University, Seneca College
- China: University of Nottingham, Ningbo, China
- China: Xi'an University of Architecture and Technology
- China, United States: Xi'an Jiaotong University and Western New England University
- China, United States: Yantai University and Illinois Institute of Technology
- Turkey: Istanbul Technical University, Istanbul Kültür University, Yildiz Technical University

== Solar Decathlon China 2013 ==
The first Solar Decathlon China was held in Datong, China, August 2–13, 2013.

The top finishers were:

- Australia: University of Wollongong
- China: South China University of Technology
- Sweden: Chalmers University of Technology (Sweden)

The other participating teams were:

1. China, United States: Tsinghua University and Florida International University
2. Belgium, United States: Polytechnic Institute of New York University, Ghent University, and Worcester Polytechnic Institute
3. Iran: Abbaspour University of Technology
4. China, United States: Peking University and University of Illinois at Urbana-Champaign
5. Israel: Tel Aviv University, Shenkar College of Engineering and Design, Neri Bloomfield School of Design and Education, College of Management Academic Studies
6. China: Inner Mongolia University of Technology
7. China, United States: Alfred State College and Guilin University of Technology and Alfred University
8. China, United Kingdom: London Metropolitan University and Guangzhou Academy of Fine Arts
9. China: Shandong Jianzhu University
10. China: Shanghai Jiaotong University
11. China: Southeast University
12. China, Switzerland: Beijing Jiaotong University and Bern University of Applied Sciences
13. China, United States: New Jersey Institute of Technology and Harbin Institute of Technology
14. Malaysia: Universiti Teknologi Malaysia
15. China: Xiamen University
16. China: Xi'an University of Architecture and Technology
17. Singapore: National University of Singapore
18. Turkey: Middle East Technical University

== See also ==
- Solar Decathlon
- Solar Decathlon Africa
- Solar Decathlon Europe
- Solar Decathlon Latin America and Caribbean
- Solar Decathlon Middle East
