= Alberta Pfeiffer =

American architect

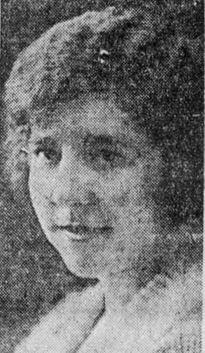
- Alberta Raffl, 1924
- Born: Alberta Raffl; September 17, 1899; Red Bud, Illinois
- Died: August 5, 1994 (aged 94); Hadlyme, New London County, Connecticut
- Occupation: architect
- Years active: 1923-1977
- Known for: First female to win the academic excellence medal of the American Institute of Architects
- Spouse: Homer Pfeiffer (married in 1930)

Alberta Raffl Pfeiffer (September 17, 1899 – August 5, 1994) was one of the first female architects in the state of Illinois and was the first woman to win the school medal for academic excellence from the American Institute of Architects.

== Biography ==
Alberta Raffl was born on September 17, 1899, in Red Bud, Illinois, to Albert L. and Johanna (née Rau) Raffl. In 1919, she enrolled as one of the first women to attend the University of Illinois School of Architecture in Urbana-Champaign. She graduated in 1923 with a degree in architecture and was the first woman to be awarded the school medal for academic excellence by the American Institute of Architects (AIA). These medals were granted each year to an outstanding student in each of the architectural programs recognized by the AIA. After graduation, she began working as a draftsman at Tallmadge and Watson in Chicago. The following year, she competed in a design competition of an orphanage offered by the Warren Prize from the Beaux Arts Institute of Design in New York and was selected to teach in the architecture department of the University of Illinois. She completed her master's degree in 1925 and moved to New York, where she began working for Harrie T. Lindeberg. For the next six years, she worked for Lindeberg, designing country estates for wealthy clients. Some of her draftings appear in the book, Domestic Architecture of H.T. Lindeberg (1927).

In 1930, Raffl married Homer Fay Pfeiffer in Rome, Italy, a Yale University architectural graduate, who had won the 1930 Rome Prize. The following year, when Homer was offered a position to teach at Yale, the couple moved to Connecticut. They bought a 1789 abandoned farm in Hadlyme, New London County, Connecticut, and set about renovating it. In 1933, they opened a joint architectural practice in their home and began working mostly on residences, completing some 70 drawings before 1940. That year, Homer joined the navy and Pfeiffer established her own practice. Her style reflected English country homes and utilized bay windows in almost every design. Before her retirement in 1977, Pfeiffer completed over 170 residential designs, mostly in Connecticut, but she did two Arizona ranches, as well as a bank and a church.

In addition to her architectural work, Pfeiffer worked for more than 25 years for the Connecticut Mental Health Association and as a volunteer at Norwich State Hospital. She served on the Lyme school board as well as the planning and zoning board and between 1969 and 1971 was a justice of the peace. She was editor of the Connecticut Craftsman, the official magazine of the Connecticut Society of Craftsmen, of which she was a member and served on the board of the Democratic town committee.

She died on August 5, 1994, in Hadlyme.

== Sources ==
- Allaback, Sarah (2008). The First American Women Architects. Champaign, Illinois: University of Illinois Press. ISBN 978-0-252-03321-6.
