= Solar Decathlon Latin America and Caribbean =

- Locations: Cali, Colombia
- Next event: December 2019
- Organiser: State of Valle del Cauca, Colombia & Ministry of Mining and Energy (MME) of the Republic of Colombia
- Website: http://solardecathlonlac.com

The Solar Decathlon is an initiative of the Department of Energy of the United States (DOE) in which universities around the world compete with the design and construction of sustainable housing that works 100% with solar energy. It is called “Decathlon" since universities and their prototypes are evaluated in 10 criteria: architecture, engineering and construction, energy efficiency, energy consumption, comfort, sustainability, positioning, communications, urban design and feasibility and innovation.

== Solar Decathlon Latin American and Caribbean 2019 ==
The 2019 edition of the Solar Decathlon Latin America and Caribbean will take place in Cali, Colombia.

=== Participating teams ===
- Brazil: Federal University of Paraíba, João Pessoa, Paraíba, Brasil
- Chile: Arturo Prat University, Chile
- Colombia: Pontificia Universidad Javeriana, Colombia
- Colombia, Brazil: Pontificia Universidad Javeriana de Cali + Universidad Federal Santa Catarina + Instituto Federal Santa Catarina, Colombia/Brasil
- Colombia: National Service of Learning, SENA, Colombia
- Colombia: Universidad de San Buenaventura + Universidad Autónoma de Occidente, Colombia
- Colombia: University of Magdalena, Santa Marta, Magdalena Department, Colombia
- Colombia: National University of Colombia, Colombia
- Colombia, Germany: Universidad de la Salle + Hochschule Ostwestfalen-Lippe University, Colombia/Alemania
- Colombia: University of Los Andes (Colombia)
- Colombia: Universidad del Valle, Colombia
- Colombia: Universidad Santiago de Cali, Colombia
- Mexico: Western Institute of Technology and Higher Education, México
- Peru: National University of Engineering, Perú
- Spain: Universidad de Sevilla, España

== Solar Decathlon Latin America and Caribbean 2015 ==
The first Solar Decathlon Latin America and Caribbean was held on the campus of Universidad del Valle in Santiago de Cali, Colombia, in December 2015.

The top finishers were:

- Uruguay: La Casa Uruguaya, Universidad ORT Uruguay (Uruguay)
- Colombia: Pontificia Universidad Javeriana de Cali and Universidad ICESI (Colombia)
- Spain, Colombia: Universidad de Sevilla and Universidad Santiago de Cali (Spain-Colombia)

The other participating teams were:

- United Kingdom: Team Heliot MET London Metropolitan University, (United Kingdom)
- Colombia: Team YARUMO Pontifical Bolivarian University (Colombia)
- Chile: Pontifical Catholic University of Chile, Santiago de Chile (Chile)
- Colombia: Pontificia Universidad Javeriana de Bogotá (Colombia)
- Colombia: Sena Valle del Cauca (Colombia)
- Colombia: Universidad de los Andes (Colombia)
- Colombia, Germany: Universidad la Salle and Hochschule Ostwestfalen-Lippe (Colombia-Germany)
- Peru: Universidad Nacional de Ingeniería del Perú
- Colombia: Universidad San Buenaventura and Universidad Autónoma de Occidente (Colombia)
- Mexico: Monterrey Institute of Technology and Higher Education, Campus Querétaro (México)
- Colombia: National University of Colombia (Colombia)
- Panama, United States: Technological University of Panama and Western New England University (Panamá-United States)

== See also ==
- Solar Decathlon Africa
- Solar Decathlon China
- Solar Decathlon Europe
- Solar Decathlon Middle East
