= Alberta Solar Decathlon Project =

The Alberta Solar Decathlon Project was an entry into the 2009 US DOE Solar Decathlon Competition in Washington, DC in October 2009. The team placed 6th out of the 20 teams present after an exciting week of not very great weather for solar power generation.

The Solar Decathlon is a high-profile, international competition in which twenty selected teams of university and college students from around the globe compete to design, build and operate the most attractive, practical and energy-efficient solar-powered home.

The event is primarily sponsored by the US Department of Energy and includes 10 individual contests for the students and their homes. It takes place biannually in October on the National Mall in Washington, D.C. The teams' houses and the sponsors' educational exhibits form a solar 'village.' The public, media, industry representatives and invited dignitaries tour the homes and exhibits and learn about solar energy, energy efficiency and home design.

== The team ==
The Alberta Solar Decathlon team is composed of Calgary's four leading post-secondary schools: the University of Calgary, SAIT Polytechnic, Mount Royal College, and the Alberta College of Art + Design.

=== Student leaders ===
- Mark Blackwell: Project Chair; University of Calgary, BCOMM Energy Management Student
- Matt Beck: Project Manager; University of Calgary, Master in Environmental Design Student
- Turc Harmesynn: Construction Manager; SAIT, Graduate
- Whitney Nordstrom: Design Team Leader; Mount Royal College, Interior Design
- Mike Gestwick: Technology Team Leader; University of Calgary, Master in Environmental Design Student
- Chris Lashmar: Thermal Systems Lead; University of Calgary, Schulich School of Engineering
- Samanta Jovanovic: Sponsorship Manager; University of Calgary, Haskayne School of Business

== See also ==
- Solar Hero, a documentary film about the project
