= Utopiastadt =

Sociocultural center in Wuppertal, Germany

- Utopiastadt
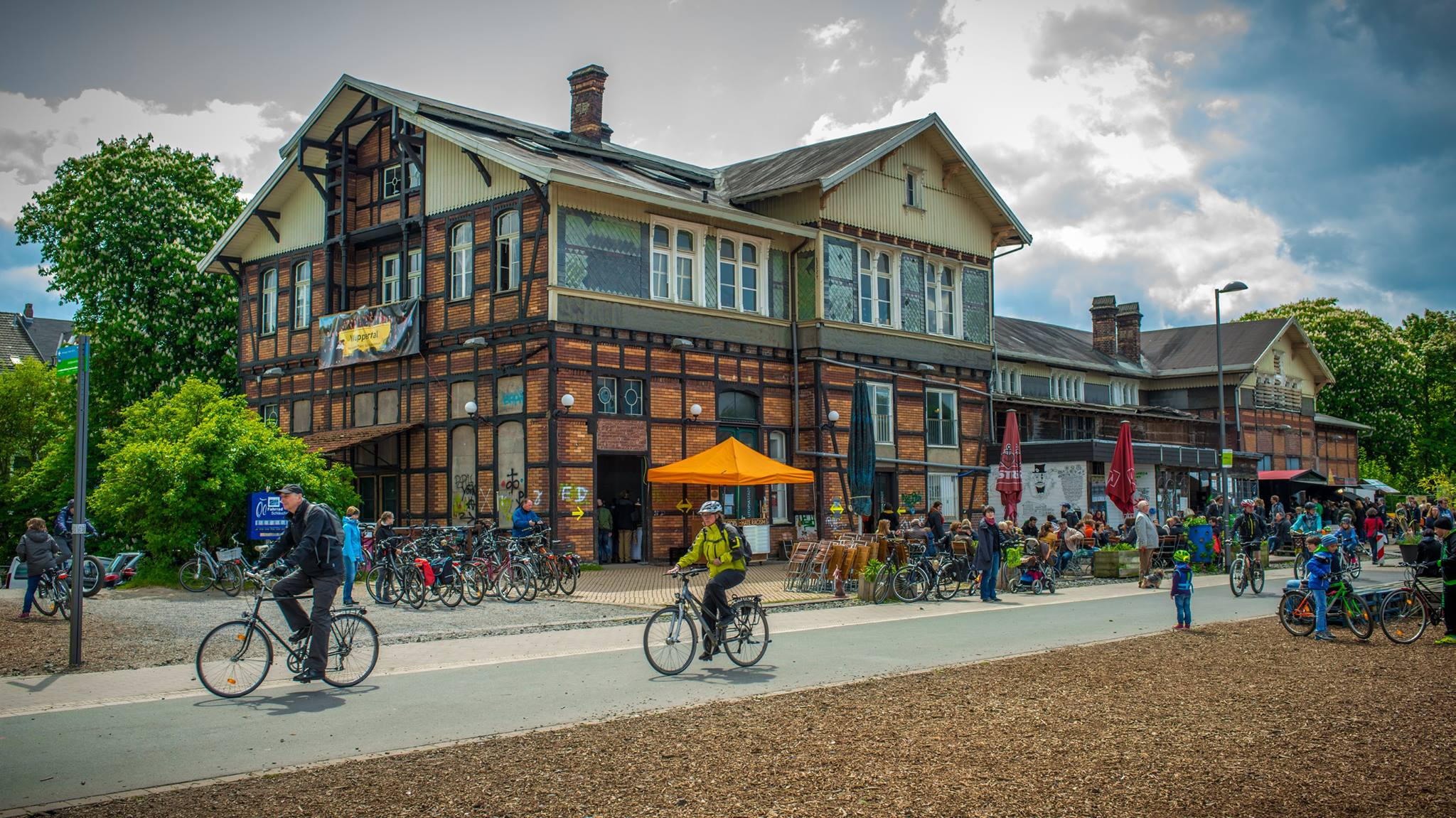
- Utopiastadt, Nordbahntrasse
- Formation: 2011
- Type: Nonprofit, Registered association
- Location: Wuppertal, Germany
- Coordinates: 51.26689113450178°N 7.145108213515195°E
- Methods: Cultural Center
- Volunteers: 200
- Website: utopiastadt.eu

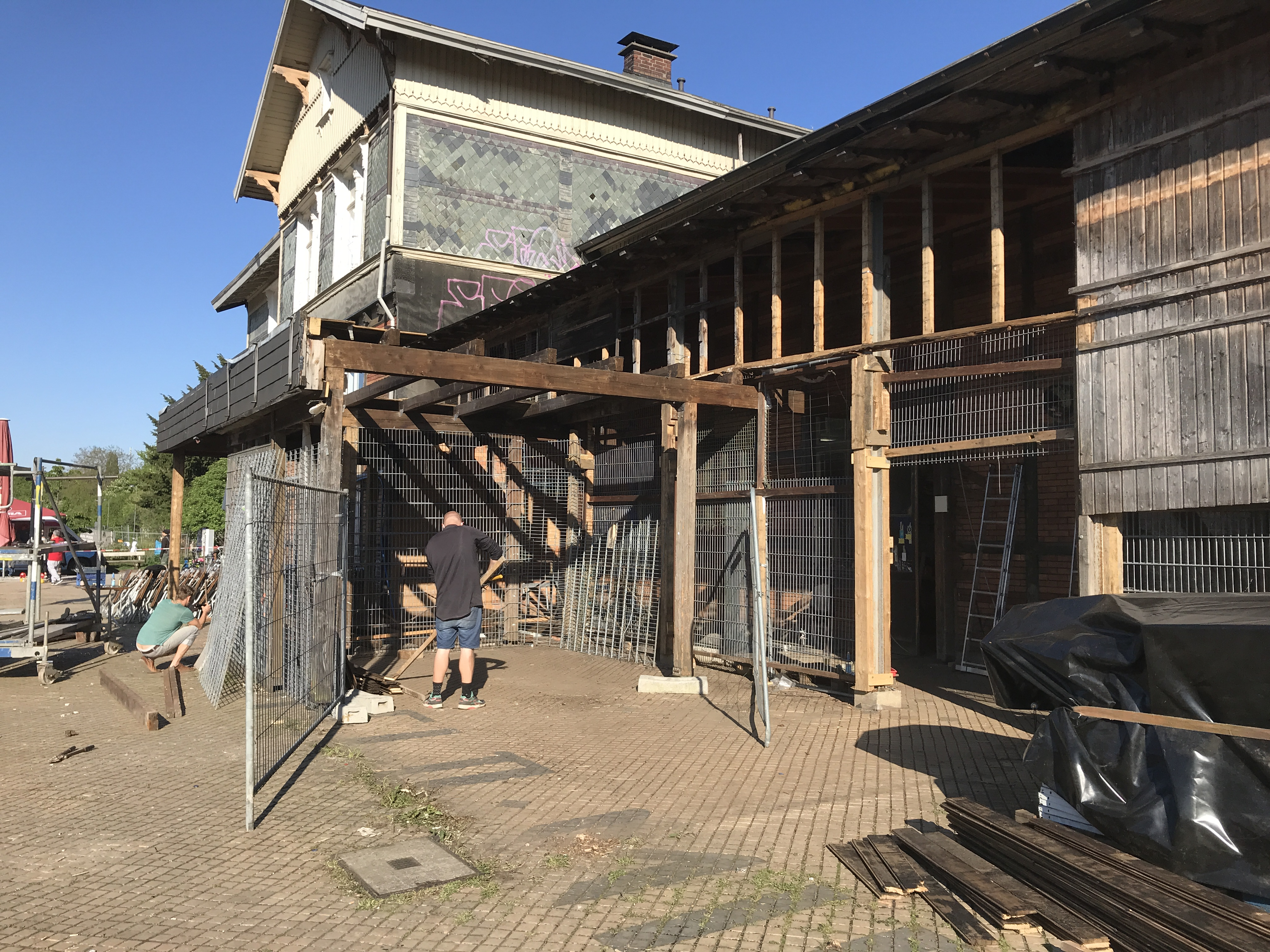
Utopiastadt, Railway Station Wuppertal-Mirke, main building renovation 2021, disassembling a wooden/iron annex

Utopiastadt (literally: "Utopia city") is a sociocultural center in Wuppertal, Germany, located in the city district of Elberfeld in the buildings of the now defunct railway station Wuppertal-Mirke, located at the "Nordbahntrasse", the railway now converted to a bike freeway. Most activities are performed by volunteers.

== History ==
After a cultural program organized by the creative agency clownfisch GbR the idea for an improved exchange of Wuppertals creative actors was born, culminating in the launch of the project in the vacant Bahnhof Wuppertal-Mirke, which could be used after help from the communal economic development office.

Utopiastadt was founded als a creative network in 2011, with ateliers and coworking space, located in the vacant building of the railway station Wuppertal-Mirke. In the same year, the Hackerspace /dev/tal moved in. In 2013, the cafe „Hutmacher“ (named after Lewis Carrols Hatter) opened, free bike rental and the open workshop/Fablab "Utopiawerkstadt" followed 2014. In the same year, the registered association "Förderverein Utopiastadt" was founded, focussing on fundraising. The association became sole shareholder of the Nonprofit Utopiastadt gGmbH, which was founded 2015.

After 5 years of successful activities, the association was gifted the station building by Wuppertals savings bank Stadtsparkasse in December 2016.

On December 5, 2018, Utopiastadt gGmbH bought 11,100 m^{2} of land around the Mirke train station, including the area of the former baggage handling area. A purchase offer for another 25,000 m^{2} was signed.

With the Solar Decathlon Europe taking place on the Utopiastadt-Campus, concepts of sustainable and resource-saving district development and architecture are developed and implemented. The conception "Solar Decathlon goes Urban" was co-developed by Utopiastadt.

=== Renovation ===
Since the beginning of use, the main building of the train station Mirke has been gradually renovated. The former baggage handling facility is being renovated since 2017, mostly through voluntary work. In 2015, the state of North Rhine-Westphalia approved funding of 3 million euros (80 percent of the total cost) through the funding and qualification offer "Initiative ergreifen". The city of Wuppertal bears a further 10 percent, the remaining 10 percent are committed through voluntary work by Utopiastadt. 2019, the main renovation process of the main building was started.

== Events and social impact ==
Once per month, a repair café for electric devices takes place, as does the bicycle repair café. Both formats offer free assistance for self-help, tools and instructions for repairing and maintaining devices and bicycles.

Since 2014, the "Only Hut" concerts have been organized regularly several times a month, in which admission is deliberately waived and instead the musicians' fees are collected by hat. For some years now, larger festivals have also been organized ("Trassenrave" and "Trassenjam", Newcomer Festival Newsides). Readings and exhibitions are also organized.

The urban gardening project Utopiastadtgarten is operated continuously and was extended in 2018 by the aquaponics system of the association “Aufbruch am Arrenberg” now located on the Utopiastadt campus.

Initiatives at the communal and regional level are active in Utopiastadt, such as Opendatal (making citizen and communal data accessible), the SmartCityNetwork (sensor technology) or the Forum Mirke. The city of Wuppertal describes the project as a "central point of contact for creative urban development [...] and thus a city laboratory for utopias." The project has developed supra-regional radiance in the areas of civic engagement, social policy and research as well as communal development.

== Awards ==
In 2015 Utopiastadt was named one of 31 Places of Progress (Ort des Fortschritts) by the state of North Rhine-Westphalia.
In 2016, Utopiastadt was awarded the Wuppertal Business Prize (Wuppertaler Wirtschaftspreis) in the City Marketing category.
In 2018, Utopiastadt was one of five winners of the CREATIVE.Space Award 2018, which is awarded by the CREATIVE.NRW Competence Center for the Creative Industry of the State of North Rhine-Westphalia.
Also in 2018, the Utopiastadt project was awarded the Federal European City Award (Bundespreis europäische Stadt).
In 2019 Utopiastadt was one of two winners of the Social Sculpture Award. The prize is awarded to social actors who creatively change social conditions in the spirit of Joseph Beuys' "Social Sculpture". In 2020 Utopiastadt became the state winner of the German Neighborhood Award (Deutscher Nachbarschaftspreis) in North Rhine-Westphalia.
