= School of Architecture (University of Illinois Urbana-Champaign) =

Architecture school of the University of Illinois Urbana-Champaign

Coordinates: 40°6′12.1″N 88°13′44.7″W

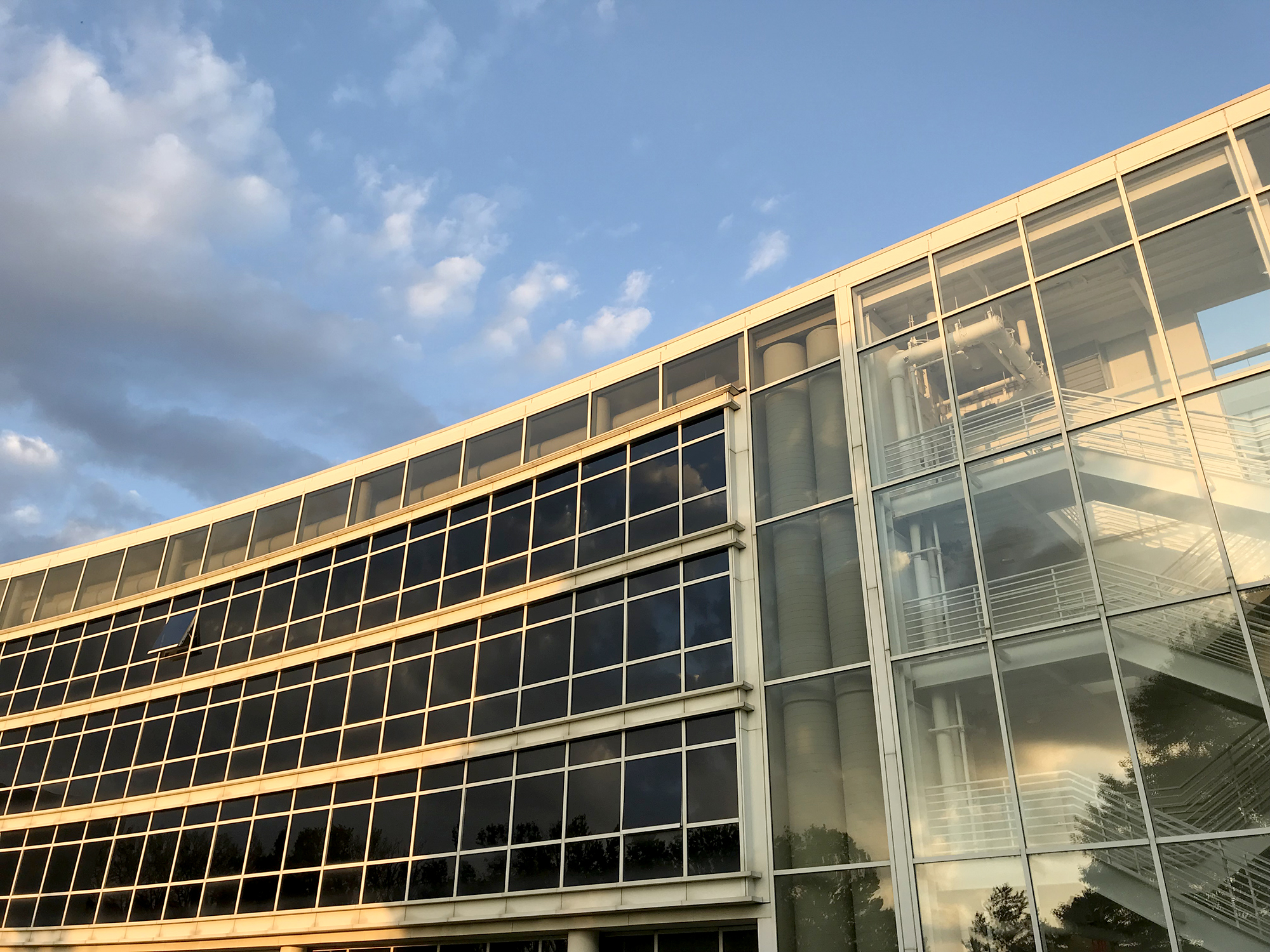
- Temple Hoyne Buell Hall
- Type: Public architecture school
- Established: 1867
- Endowment: US$6.674 million
- Director: Francisco Javier Rodríguez-Suárez, FAIA
- Faculty: 40
- Students: 652
- Undergraduates: 498
- Postgraduates: 154
- Location: Champaign, Illinois, U.S.
- Admissions: March (24.95%)
- Website: arch.illinois.edu

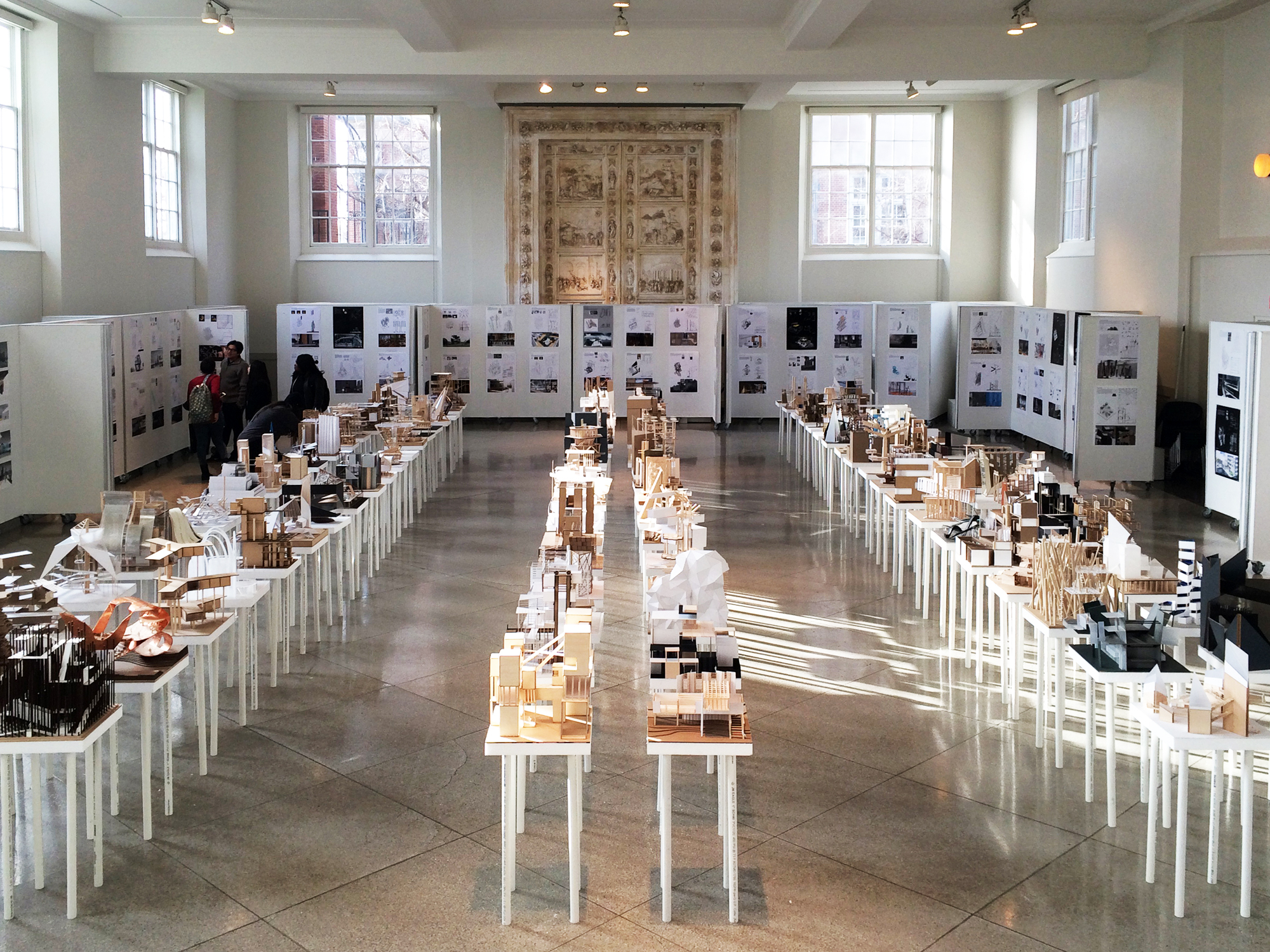
Exhibit of student design projects, Temple Buell Architecture Gallery

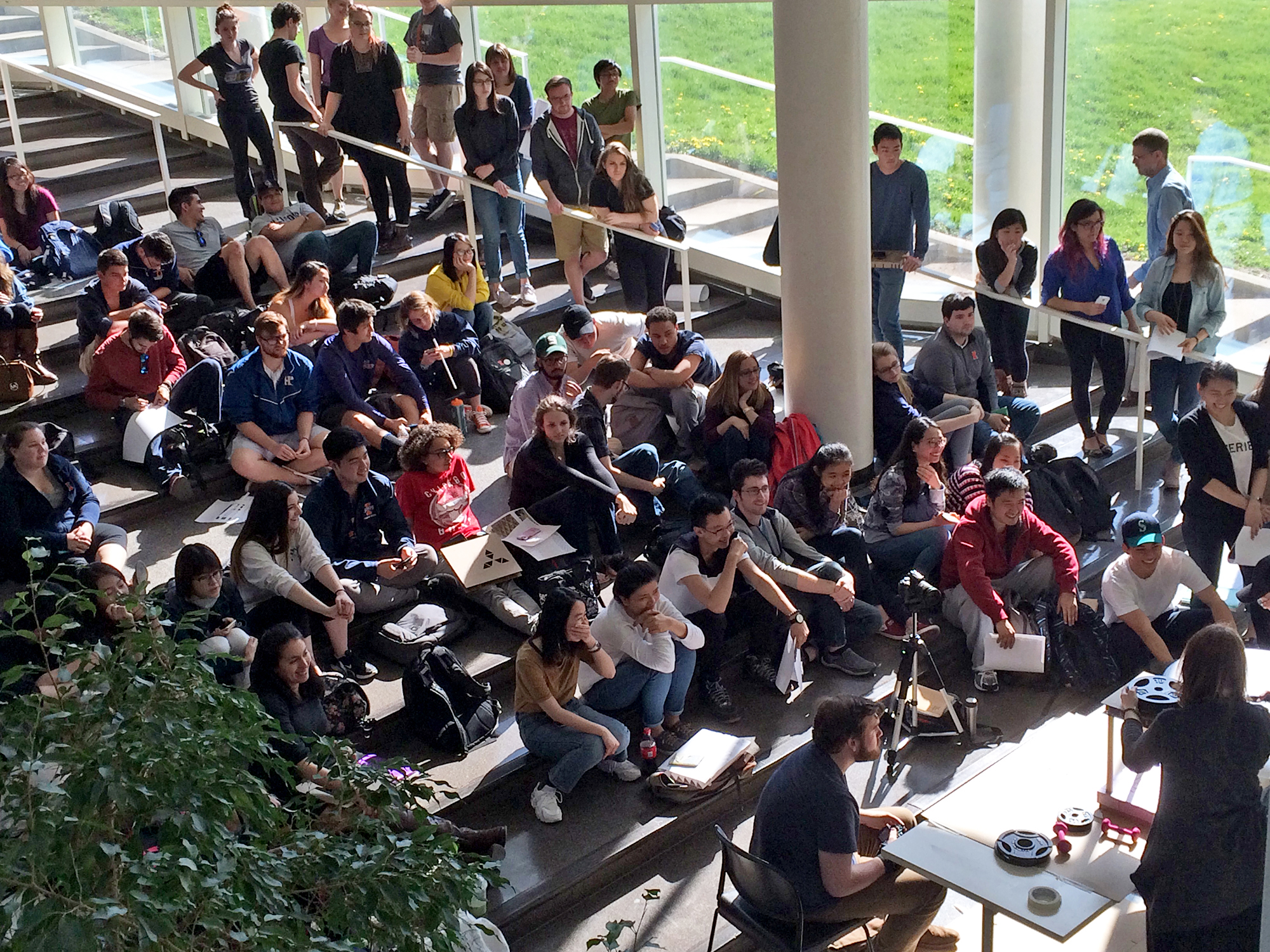
An architecture class meeting in Blicharski Atrium of Temple Buell Hall

The School of Architecture is a department-level school within the College of Fine and Applied Arts at the University of Illinois Urbana-Champaign.

The School of Architecture is organized around six areas: Building Performance; Detail + Fabrication; Health + Well-being; History + Theory + Preservation; Design of Tall Buildings; and Urbanism. Faculty teach and conduct research in these areas in support of the School's primary objective to promote critical engagement with the design of a healthy and sustainable built environment.

== History ==
The University of Illinois Urbana-Champaign was among the first American institutions of higher learning to offer a curriculum in architecture. Until 1868 there were no architectural schools in the United States, although Thomas Jefferson had proposed one at the University of Virginia in 1814. American architects were trained through apprenticeships or pursued studies abroad. The profession's growing awareness of the need for a professional architecture school in the United States was evidenced by the report of the Committee on Education at the first annual convention of the American Institute of Architects in 1867.

In October 1868 the MIT architecture department opened with four students in the four-year course. Almost a thousand miles to the west, newly appointed Regent John Milton Gregory, at the newly established center of learning, the Illinois Industrial University (renamed the University of Illinois in 1878), also realized the need for formal professional training in architecture. Architecture was included in the Polytechnic Department of the proposed administrative structure Gregory presented to the trustees in May 1867. The first student in this curriculum, Nathan Clifford Ricker arrived in Urbana on January 2, 1870. Ricker became the first graduate of an architecture program in the United States in March 1873. He later became head of the Department of Architecture and oversaw the architectural education of many students. One, Mary Louisa Page, was the first woman to graduate with a degree in architecture in North America when she graduated from the University of Illinois in 1879. In 1890, the school was the first in the United States to offer architectural engineering.

== Degree programs ==
The Illinois School of Architecture awards the following degrees: a NAAB-accredited professional degree of Master of Architecture (M.Arch), Master of Science in Architectural Studies (MSAS), Bachelor of Science in Architecture Studies (BSAS), and Doctor of Philosophy (PhD) in Architecture.

Two tracks are provided for students in the professional M.Arch degree program. The first is for students who hold a Bachelor of Science degree in Architecture or its equivalent; the second is for students holding a bachelor's degree in a field other than architecture or in architecture but not equivalent to a Bachelor of Science in architecture.

For graduate students, the School also offers a series of joint-degree programs, allowing students to earn two master's degrees in an accelerated timeframe. These include the M.Arch + MBA (Master of Business Administration) program, offered jointly with the College of Business at Illinois, the M.Arch + MUP (Master of Urban Planning) program, offered with the Department of Urban and Regional Planning at Illinois, The M.Arch + MS in Civil Engineering - Structural Engineering and the M.Arch + MS in Civil Engineering - Construction Management programs, offered with the Department of Civil and Environmental Engineering at Illinoi.

Additionally, the school offers a Minor in Architecture to non-architecture undergraduate students and Discover Architecture, a two-week summer program which provides high school students and beginning college students the opportunity to be introduced to architectural graphics, design, and modeling.

== School traditions ==
- Architecture Award Banquet (A3)
- Annual Beaux-Arts Ball
- Critical Mass
- East St. Louis Action Research Project (ESLARP)

== School facilities ==
- Architecture Building (Arch)
- Temple Hoyne Buell Hall (TBH)
- Architecture East Annex One (Annex)
- Ricker Library of Architecture and Art (Ricker)
- The Erlanger House
- Chicago Studio

== Directors ==
- Nathan Clifford Ricker (1873–1910)
- Fredrick Mann (1910–1913)
- Loring Provine (1913–1948)
- Turpin Bannister (1948–1954)
- Alan Laing (1954–1961)
- Granville Keith (1961–1966)
- Jack Swing (1966–1973)
- Richard Tavis (1973, 1980–1981)
- Day Ding (1973–1980)
- Alan Forrester (1981–1995, 1996–1998)
- Hub White (1995–1996)
- Michael Andrejasich (1999–2004)
- David Chasco, FAIA (2004–2014)
- Peter Leslie Mortensen (2014–2017)
- Jeffery Poss, FAIA (2017–2019)
- Mohamed Boubekri (Fall 2019)
- Francisco J. Rodríguez-Suárez, FAIA (2020–present)

== Student organizations ==
- Alpha Rho Chi (APX) architecture fraternity
- American Institute of Architecture Students (AIAS)
- Architecture Student Advisory Council (ASAC)
- Architecture, Regional & Urban Planning and Landscape Architecture Open House (ARUPLA)
- Ecological Design Consortium (EDC)
- The Gargoyle Architecture Honor Society
- Global Architecture Brigade
- Hispanic Organization for Urban Studies and the Environment (HOUSE)
- National Organization of Minority Architecture Students (NOMAS)
- Society of Architectural Historians (SAH)
- Society for Business and Management in Architecture (SBMA)
- Society for Evidence-Based Architecture (SEBA)
- Women in Architecture (WIA)
- Illinois Solar Decathlon (ISD)

== Plym Distinguished Visiting Professorship ==
The Plym Distinguished Visiting Professorship at the School of Architecture brings recognized architects to the school so that they can serve as lead studio critic with a School of Architecture faculty member as liaison and students in the studio have often traveled to the main office of the Plym Professor.

The Plym Distinguished Professorship is made possible by a 1981 gift to the school by the late Lawrence J. Plym of Niles, Michigan, past president of the Kawneer Corporation.

Plym Distinguished Professors:

- Gunnar Birkerts (1982–83)
- Paul Rudolph (1983–84)
- Joseph Esherick (1986–87)
- Edmund Bacon (1991–92)
- Thom Mayne (1992–93)
- Carme Pinos (1994–95)
- Dominique Perrault (1998)
- Frances Halsband (2001)
- Norman Crowe (2003)
- Ken Yeang (2006)
- Kengo Kuma (2007–08)
- Kenneth Frampton (2008–09)
- Juhani Pallasmaa (2010–11)
- Gong Dong (2019)
- Suchi Reddy (2019)
- Mark Raymond (Spring 2021)
- Solano Benítez (Fall 2021)

== Notable alumni ==
- Max Abramovitz, B.S. 1929, architect of the Avery Fisher Hall of Lincoln Center and Assembly Hall on the Illinois campus
- Henry Bacon, 1884, architect of the Lincoln Memorial in Washington D.C.
- Clarence Blackall, B.S. 1877, architect for Wang Center in Boston
- Temple Hoyne Buell, B.S. 1916
- Alfred T. Fellheimer, B.S. 1895, lead architect of Grand Central Terminal
- Jeanne Gang, B.S. 1986, founder and principal of the Chicago architecture firm Studio Gang
- Ralph Johnson, B.Arch 1971, principal architect of the Perkins+Will
- David Miller, M.Arch. 1972, founding principal of the Miller/Hull Partnership; fellow of American Institute of Architect
- César Pelli, M.Arch. 1954, architect of Petronas Twin Towers in Kuala Lumpur
- William Pereira, M.Arch. 1930, architect of Transamerica Pyramid and Geisel Library
- Alberta Pfeiffer, 1923, architect, one of the first women to attend the college
- Nathan Clifford Ricker, D.Arch. 1873, architecture educator
- Carol Ross Barney, B.Arch. 1971, founder and principal of the Ross Barney Architects, which designed the Champaign Public Library
- Lebbeus Woods
