= Illinois Solar Decathlon =

- Type: Private
- Industry: Architectural, Engineering, Construction, Sustainability
- Founded: August 2007
- Founder: Kevin Donovan
- Headquarters: Champaign-Urbana, IL
- Key people: Connor Bogner, Ryan Christiansen, Halie Collins, Eshana Jain
- Number of employees: ~200
- Parent: University of Illinois at Urbana-Champaign
- Website: https://www.illinoissolardecathlon.com/

Illinois Solar Decathlon (ISD) is an interdisciplinary organization based in the Champaign-Urbana, IL and is the official Solar Decathlon team for the University of Illinois at Urbana-Champaign. It is also closely affiliated with the Illinois School of Architecture.

== History and mission ==
Illinois Solar Decathlon was formed in 2007 after the university's involvement in three past Solar Decathlon competitions. Starting in 2002, the US Department of Energy sponsors a biannual competition where twenty universities from around the world design and construct an innovative and efficient net-zero home. They are transported to a central location and over the course of a week the homes are judged in ten different criteria including energy balance, architecture, communications, and market appeal to name a few. With ISD's increasing involvement in the Solar Decathlon's competition, Europe began having their own Solar Decathlon competitions in 2007, with China joining in a few years later in 2013.

The RSO works to recruit future team members, maintain sponsor relations, and help maintain the three past homes that are near campus. ISD also aims to educate the campus and community about the importance of sustainable energy efficient homes and hope to provide a strong foundation for future Illinois Decathlon teams. ISD has focused on interdisciplinary teamwork and collaboration, with students in architecture, engineering and like disciplines working together on various projects. ISD is constantly searching for new members and there are many opportunities for involvement including working on past homes, marketing efforts, or even being part of the next design team.

== Projects - Solar Decathlon competitions ==
The Solar Decathlon competitions are intended to be a “research goal of reducing the cost of solar-powered homes and advancing solar technology,” according to the Solar Decathlon 2007 (SD07). Illinois Solar Decathlon began its involvement with the Solar Decathlon competitions in the 2007 competition.

=== 2007 Illinois Solar Decathlon Project - ElementHouse ===
The 2007 Solar Decathlon Competition is the third competition held and the first time the University of Illinois competed in.

The concept for the University of Illinois' Solar Decathlon Team's 2007 house is a flexible modular system that can provide utility-independent housing for temporary or seasonal use. Beyond the goal of winning the competition, Illinois hopes that its final product can serve as a model for emergency housing situations such as those experienced by citizens of the Gulf Coast as a result of Hurricane Katrina in 2005.

=== 2009 Illinois Solar Decathlon Project - Gable Home ===
Immediately following success in the 2007 competition, ISD began work on the 2009 competition entry. The primary concept of ISD's 2009 entry, named Gable Home, is to create a synthesis between innovative technology and vernacular Midwestern architecture. This synthesis results in a synergetic relationship between the two, creating an environmentally sustainable home of the future. The design exhibits a strong preference for reused/reclaimed materials over the production of new material. The siding of the house was reclaimed from a barn being deconstructed in Rockford, Illinois. The decking material was salvaged from a demolished grain silo in Champaign, Illinois. Restoring and repurposing material from farm structures strengthened the overall design emphasis on local vernacular architecture.

=== 2011 Illinois Solar Decathlon Project - Re_home ===
For the 2011 Solar Decathlon competition, Team Illinois has designed the Re_home. Designed for rapid assembly after a natural disaster, the solar powered home demostrates how environmentally aware living can be brought to the forefront of a community-led recovery effort. Through a carefully thought out process, the Re_home can be pre-constructed and quickly deployed immediately following a natural disaster.

When called upon, the house mobilizes quickly from its constructed location towards new communities. Upon arrival the house is assembled within several hours. Once sealed, the home becomes a livable space the day it arrives, providing new shelter for disaster victims. During the days following delivery the rest of the house can be assembled by members of the community. Pre-installed adjustable solar panels provide renewable energy quickly, and prefabricated modular decks, planters, and canopies ease installation of all exterior elements of the home.

The 2011 competition team was led by Dr. Xinlei Wang, Ph.D. and Mark Taylor, AIA. To complement the leadership, members from the College of Agriculture, Consumer, and Environmental Sciences (ACES) joined the team, including David Weightman, James Anderson, Joe Harper, Sarah Taylor Lovell.

=== 2013 Illinois Solar Decathlon Project - Etho ===
The 2013 Solar Decathlon Competition featured the first ever Solar Decathlon competition held in China. For the 2013 competition, Illinois Solar Decathlon from the University of Illinois at Urbana-Champaign designed their project in collaboration with Peking University in Beijing. The international team hopes that their house will increase public awareness for solar technology and promote low-carbon development.

Etho is centered around a feeling of solace; an urban oasis. It meets the Chinese market's need for a refuge from overcrowded cities and inspires the Chinese public to see the potential in a high-quality sustainability. Ethos's design philosophy is centered on creating a better future, creating a link to China's rich past, and sculpting a home perfectly suited to meet the needs of its inhabitants. Designed for the next generation of young families as a sustainable getaway, this solar-powered home will demonstrate how educating one influential demographic can help to spread awareness of environmental sustainability and energy. Its design emphasizes natural daylighting and maximizing solar gains on the PV arrays.

Similar to the 2011 competition, the 2013 competition team was also led by Dr. Xinlei Wang, Ph.D. and Mark Taylor, AIA. Mike McCully, a professor at the Illinois School of Architecture, joined the leadership and assisted in the architectural aspects of the project.

== Projects - U.S. Department of Energy Race to Zero Competition ==
Starting in fall of 2014, Illinois Solar Decathlon began its involvement in the U.S. Department of Energy's Race to Zero Competition.

=== 2015 Illinois Solar Decathlon Race to Zero Project - Sun Catcher Cottage ===
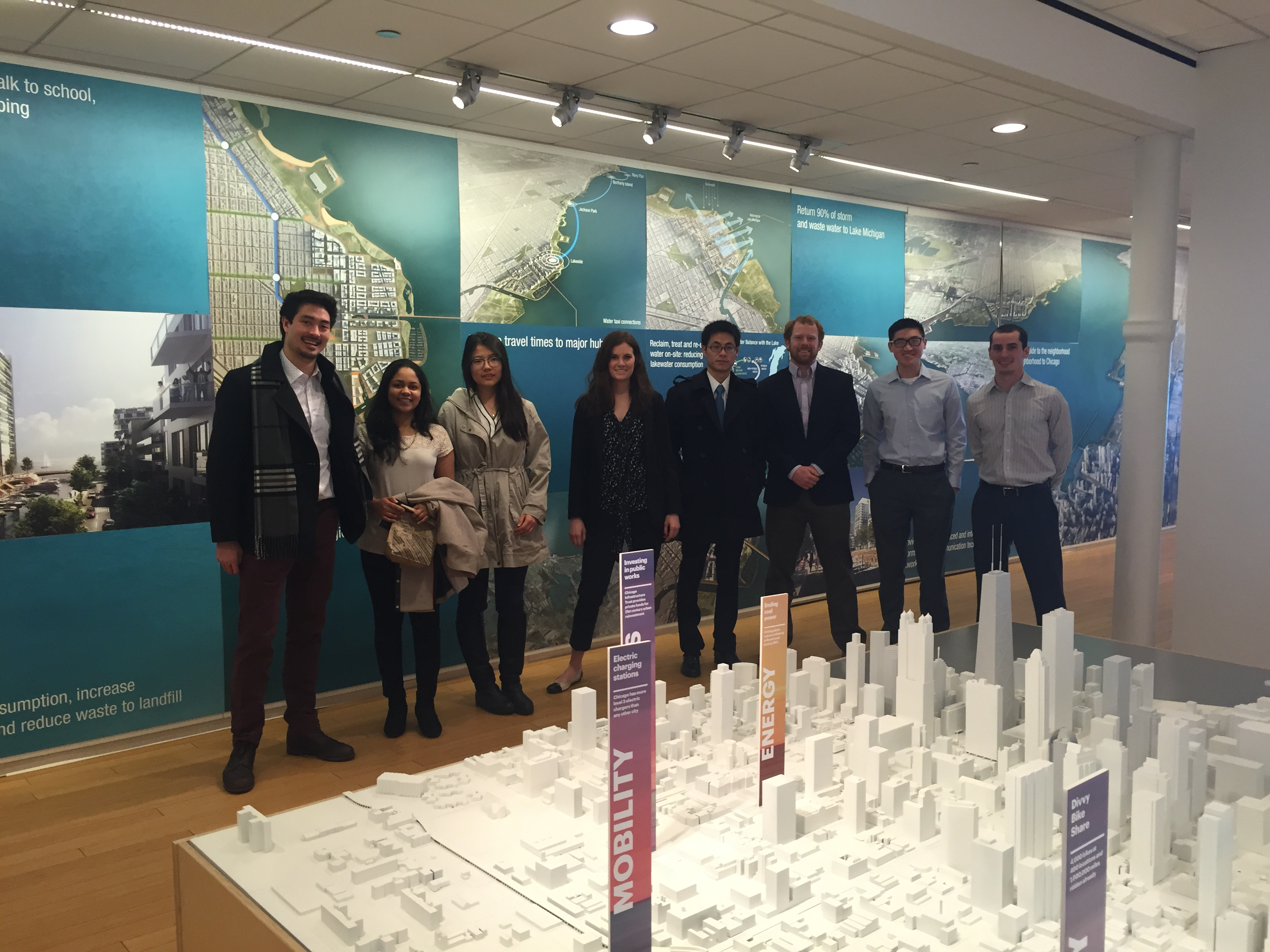
Members of the 2015 ISD Race to Zero competition team meeting with architectural firm Skidmore, Owings, and Merrill, LLP in Chicago, IL to work on their project.

In the fall of 2014, ISD commenced work on the 2015 Race to Zero Competition. Previous 2013 Solar Decathlon member, Matthew McClone, LEED AP BD+C, who worked on the 2013 SD project, Etho, was selected to lead the 2015 Race to Zero Competition. The architectural aspects of the project were headed by Ryan Christiansen. Other notable team members include Priscilla Zhang, LEED GA, Robert Moy, Assoc. AIA, Sean Killarney, LEED GA, and Kasey Colombani. The concept of ISD's 2015 Project was a theoretical deep energy retrofit based on a cottage located in Allerton Park, located in Monticello, Illinois. The name of the project is called Sun Catcher Cottage. The project was then presented in Golden, CO on April 18–20, 2015. Illinois Solar Decathlon was awarded the Grand Winner Finalist during the competition.

=== 2016 Illinois Solar Decathlon Race to Zero Project - Linkoln Locale ===
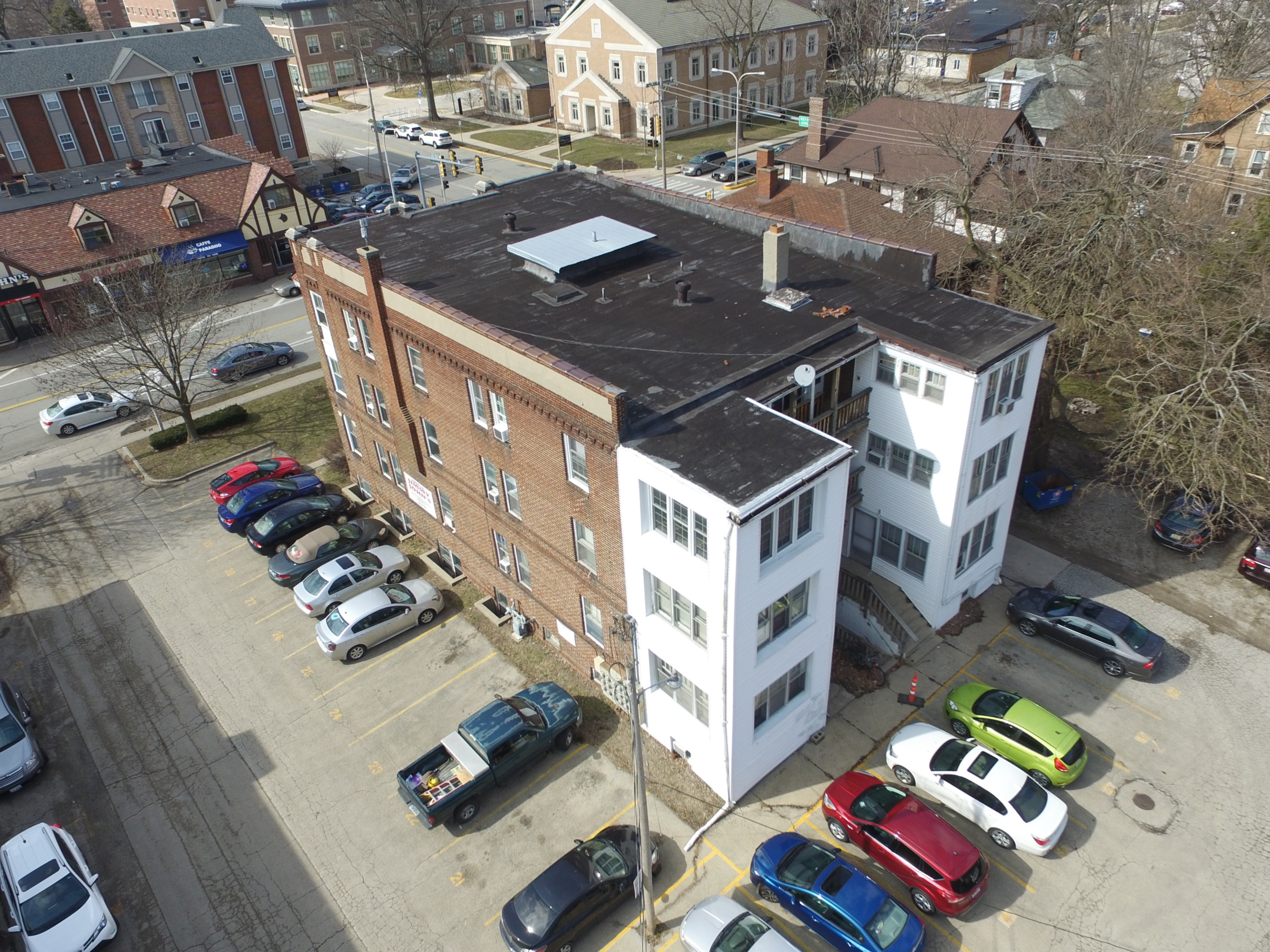
An aerial view of the existing 3-story apartment building renovated by Illinois Solar Decathlon as part of the 2016 Race to Zero project.

In the fall of 2015, ISD returned to enter the 2016 Race to Zero competition. For the 2016 competition, several key members of previous years' 2015 competition team transferred to focus their work on the 2017 Solar Decathlon competition. Amir Amizadeh, Assoc. AIA, LEED GA and Vasco Chan were selected as the Lead Project Manager and Assistant Project Manager, respectively. Previous 2015 R20 architecture team member Robert Moy, Assoc. AIA was promoted to Competition Lead and one of the Project Managers for the 2016 competition, while previous 2015 R20 member Priscilla Puchun Zhang was promoted to Architecture Team Lead. The team's 2016 contest entry proposed a deep retrofit of an existing 3-story ~4,000 sq. ft. student apartment building located in Urbana, IL near the campus of the University of Illinois at Urbana-Champaign. The new proposal for the 1920s 3 story building has eight rental units, featuring two, three or four bedrooms each. The team aimed for an overall integrated design, seamlessly unifying certain building systems, such as lighthing, HVAC, architectural details, materials and finishes. The ISD team won 2nd place overall in the 2016 competition, which was held on April 16–17, 2016.

Judges during the 2016 Race to Zero Competition commended ISD for their use of an existing maintenance shaft that was converted to allow natural ventilation.

=== 2017 Illinois Solar Decathlon Race to Zero Project - TBA ===
Following success in the 2015 and 2016 Race to Zero competitions, members of ISD reconvened to enter the 2017 Competition. In the 2017 competition, the team will be led by Lead Project Manager Robert Moy, Assoc. AIA and Michael Najder, Assoc. AIA, LEED GA.

== Projects – Solar Decathlon Build Competitions ==
=== 2021 Illinois Solar Decathlon Build Project – ADAPTHAUS ===
ADAPTHAUS, the 2021 Illinois Solar Decathlon Build Project and the University of Illinois Urbana-Champaign's entry in the U.S. Department of Energy Solar Decathlon.

ADAPTHAUS was Illinois Solar Decathlon's entry into the 2021 U.S. Department of Energy Solar Decathlon. Developed over two years, the project explored the feasibility of high-performance, affordable housing through a modular design that could adapt to changing household sizes and living requirements.

The home consists of two 600-square-foot modules, providing approximately 1,200 square feet of living space. Its modular configuration was designed to allow additional sections to be incorporated as household needs change over time. The design also incorporated Energy Star-certified and Americans with Disabilities Act (ADA)-compliant appliances to improve energy efficiency and accessibility.

ADAPTHAUS features a 7.6-kilowatt photovoltaic system consisting of 24 solar panels, along with energy monitoring through a Sense Solar Energy Monitor. A CERV2 energy recovery ventilator supports indoor air quality. The project also incorporated water conservation measures that reduced estimated water use by approximately 29% compared with Environmental Protection Agency baseline standards, as well as rainwater collection infrastructure and provisions for future graywater recycling.

Following its completion and competition showcase, the home was donated through Habitat for Humanity to support affordable, high-performance housing in the local community.

=== 2023 Illinois Solar Decathlon Build Project – RENU-House ===
RENU-House, the 2023 Illinois Solar Decathlon residential build project in Rantoul, Illinois.

RENU-House, an acronym for Renewable, Economical, Nourishing, and Universal, was developed by the Illinois Solar Decathlon team between 2021 and 2023. Located in Rantoul, Illinois, the project explored how energy-efficient housing could accommodate changing household needs while remaining accessible and affordable.

The home was designed as a positive net-energy residence, generating more energy than it consumes over the course of a year. Its adaptable floor plan incorporates a flexible room that allows the interior to transition between a three-bedroom circular layout and a four-bedroom configuration. The design emphasizes accessibility, including compliance with Americans with Disabilities Act (ADA) requirements, and accommodates a range of household arrangements, including multigenerational families.

The home incorporates a grid-connected solar photovoltaic system with battery backup, an open-source smart home system, and a heat recovery ventilation system using decentralized fans. A custom application allows residents to monitor energy generation and consumption. Additional sustainability features include an efficient plumbing layout, a rain garden for stormwater management, native landscaping, and designated garden beds for growing produce.

Following the project's completion, Illinois Solar Decathlon partnered with the Champaign chapter of Habitat for Humanity to donate the home to a local family in need.

== Projects – Community Housing Initiatives ==
Following the indefinite cancellation of the U.S. Department of Energy Solar Decathlon Build Challenge, Illinois Solar Decathlon expanded its focus toward implementing sustainable housing solutions directly within local communities. These initiatives build on the organization's experience in energy-efficient residential design while emphasizing affordability, practical construction, and long-term community impact.

=== 2026 Illinois Solar Decathlon Community Housing Build Project – BEACON Home ===
BEACON Home, the 2026 Illinois Solar Decathlon residential construction project in Rantoul, Illinois.

BEACON Home, an acronym for Building Energy-Efficient, Affordable, Community-Oriented Neighborhoods, is a residential construction project developed by Illinois Solar Decathlon in partnership with the Village of Rantoul and Habitat for Humanity. Located in Rantoul, Illinois, the project marked a shift from competition-based design toward the direct implementation of sustainable housing in a local community.

The completed residence contains more than 1,700 square feet of living space, with three bedrooms and two bathrooms. The all-electric home incorporates rooftop solar energy, an efficient building envelope, and integrated mechanical systems designed to support energy efficiency, durability, and occupant comfort. A performance monitoring dashboard enables residents to track the home's energy production and consumption.

Construction began in early 2026, with Broeren-Russo Builders serving as the general contractor. Illinois Solar Decathlon organized the project across specialized teams responsible for architecture, photovoltaic and electrical systems, heating, ventilation and air conditioning (HVAC), water systems, site development, construction management, and lighting, appliances, and home automation.

Upon completion, BEACON Home was donated through Habitat for Humanity to a local family. The project demonstrates Illinois Solar Decathlon's continued commitment to making sustainable housing technologies accessible beyond collegiate competitions.

=== Current Illinois Solar Decathlon Community Housing Build Project – Lot 101 ===
Lot 101 is the ongoing community housing initiative by Illinois Solar Decathlon located adjacent to BEACON Home in Rantoul, Illinois. The project continues the organization's efforts to apply sustainable residential design and construction strategies to local housing needs.

Building on the experience gained through BEACON Home, Lot 101 extends Illinois Solar Decathlon's community-focused work beyond individual competition entries. Its location alongside BEACON Home provides an opportunity to develop additional housing while continuing the organization's broader focus on energy efficiency, affordability, and community-oriented residential development.
