= Ion Mincu University of Architecture and Urban Planning =

- Universitatea de Arhitectură și Urbanism "Ion Mincu" din București
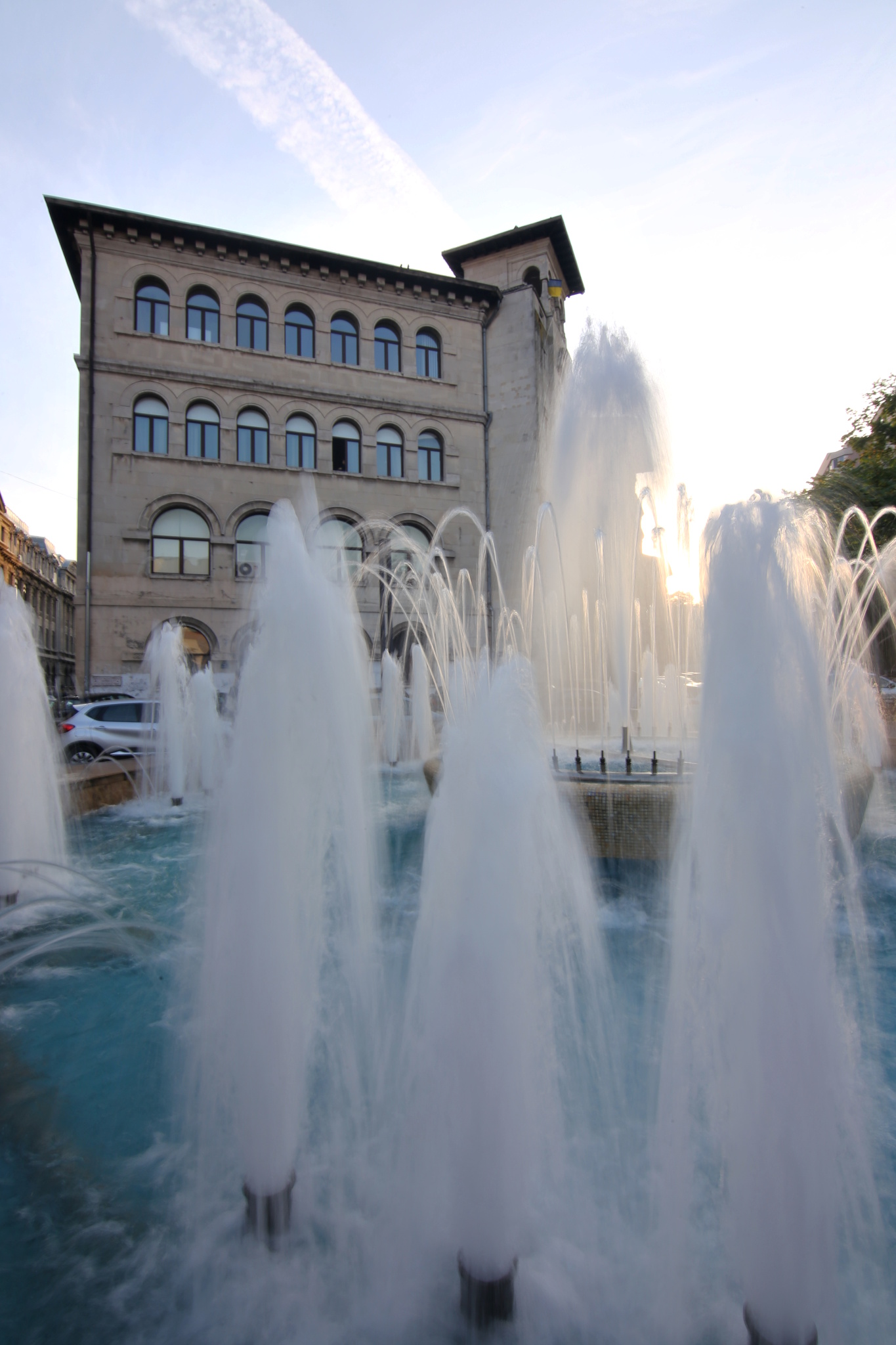
- Former names: Ion Mincu Institute of Architecture (1952–2000)
- Type: Public
- Established: 14 November 1952; 73 years ago 1931 – Academy of Architecture; 1904 – Higher School of Architecture; 1864 – School of Bridges and Roads, Mines and Architecture
- Rector: Marian Moiceanu
- Location: Strada Academiei, nr. 18–20, Sector 1, Bucharest, 010014, Romania; 44°26′11″N 26°06′00″E
- Website: www.uauim.ro

The Ion Mincu University of Architecture and Urban Planning (Romanian: Universitatea de Arhitectură și Urbanism "Ion Mincu" din București) is a public university for architectural and urbanism studies located at 18–20 Academiei Street in Sector 1 of Bucharest, Romania. The university is named after the architect and engineer Ion Mincu. It was formerly named Superior School of Architecture in Bucharest (Romanian: Școala Superioară de Arhitectură din București).
