= Solar Decathlon =

American collegiate competition centered on renewable energy

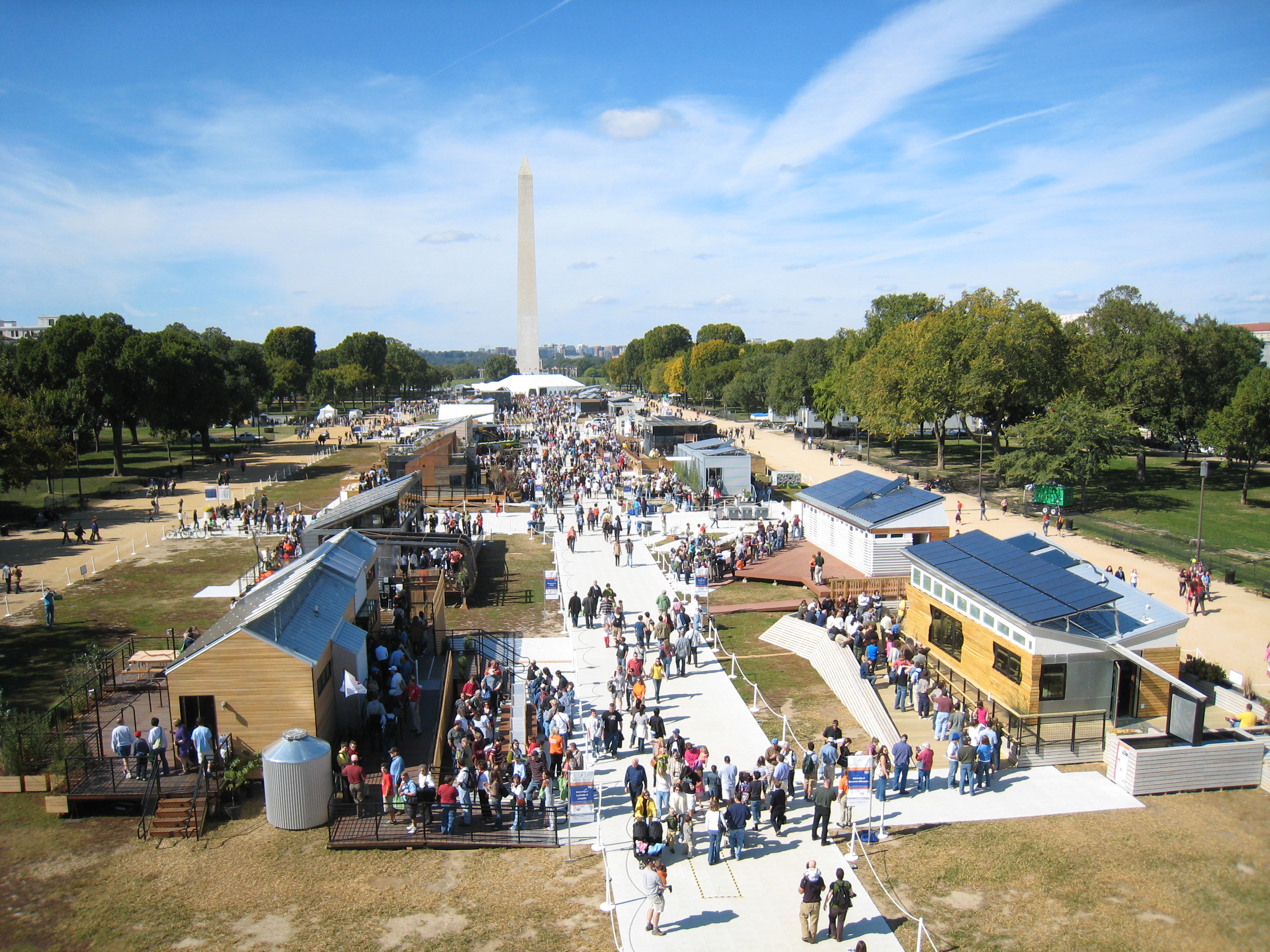
Student-built houses powered exclusively by solar power on display in Washington D.C. at the Solar Decathlon 2009.

The U.S. Department of Energy (DOE) Solar Decathlon is a collegiate competition, comprising 10 contests, that challenges student teams to design and build highly efficient and innovative buildings powered by renewable energy. The winners are selected based for the best blending of design architectural and engineering excellence with innovation, market potential, building efficiency, and smart energy production. In the summer of 2018, DOE merged its two student building design competitions into one Solar Decathlon competition.

The combined competition features two tracks, the Design Challenge and the Build Challenge. The Solar Decathlon provides practical experience and specialized training that prepares competing students to enter the clean energy workforce. This international competition has been a vehicle in raising public awareness about clean energy since its inception in 2002. Technologies and solutions used in Solar Decathlon homes have advanced the residential building industry both in the United States and abroad.

After the first Solar Decathlon was held in 2002, the competition occurred biennially in 2005, 2007, 2009, 2011, 2013, 2015 and 2017. The Solar Decathlon 2017 was located in Denver, Colorado, adjacent to the 61st & Peña station on the University of Colorado A line commuter train connecting Denver International Airport to downtown Union Station. In addition to the competition, Solar Decathlon 2017 also featured a sustainability expo, professional development and consumer workshops, and middle-school education events.

Open to the public and free of charge, the Solar Decathlon allows visitors to tour energy- and water-efficient houses, and gather ideas to save energy and conserve water in their own homes.

The Solar Decathlon 2017 competition was presented by DOE and administered by Energetics, Incorporated, a subsidiary of VSE Corporation. Previous competitions were administered by the National Renewable Energy Laboratory (NREL).

Since the first competition in 2002, the Solar Decathlon has expanded internationally to include competitions in Europe, China, Latin America and Caribbean, the Middle East, and Africa. Solar Decathlon Europe was established under a 2007 memorandum of understanding between the United States and Spain, which hosted competitions in 2010 and 2012. France hosted in 2014. The Solar Decathlon Europe 2019 was hosted by Hungary in Szentendre. The next Solar Decathlon Europe was planned for 2021, in Wuppertal, Germany and postponed to 2022 due to the COVID-19 pandemic.

The Solar Decathlon China was established with the signing of a memorandum of understanding between DOE, China’s National Energy Administration, Peking University and Applied Materials on January 20, 2011. The first Solar Decathlon China took place in August 2013 in the city of Datong. The next Solar Decathlon China will take place in 2018 and was formed through a memorandum of understanding among the United States Department of Energy, the People’s Republic of China, and the China Overseas Development Corporation.

Solar Decathlon Latin America and Caribbean was established under a memorandum of understanding between the United States Department of Energy and the government of Colombia in 2014. The first competition was held in Cali in December 2015, and another competition is planned for 2019.

Solar Decathlon Middle East, to be held in Dubai, United Arab Emirates, in 2018, was formed by a memorandum of understanding between DOE and the Dubai Electricity and Water Authority in 2015. An additional Solar Decathlon Middle East is also expected to take place in 2020.

On November 15, 2016, the Moroccan Ministry of Energy, Mines, Water, and the Environment (MEMEE); the Moroccan Research Institute for Solar Energy and New Energies (IRESEN); and DOE signed a memorandum of understanding to collaborate on the development of Solar Decathlon Africa. The competition is planned for 2019.

== History ==
The inaugural Solar Decathlon was open to the public between September 19 and October 6, 2002. Fourteen teams from across the United States, including Puerto Rico, presented their projects on the National Mall in Washington, D.C. The University of Colorado was awarded first place.

At the second Solar Decathlon, likewise held on the National Mall on October 6–16, 2005, 18 teams from the United States, Canada, and Spain participated; the University of Colorado successfully defended its championship.

The third Solar Decathlon took place on the National Mall on October 12–20, 2007. Twenty teams from the United States, Canada, Spain, and Germany competed, and Technische Universität Darmstadt (Team Germany) was named the overall champion.

The fourth Solar Decathlon was held on the National Mall on October 8–18, 2009, and included teams from the United States, Canada, Germany, and Spain; Team Germany was named the winner for a second time.

The fifth Solar Decathlon took place between September 23 and October 2, 2011, with nineteen participating teams representing the United States, China, New Zealand, Belgium, and Canada. The event was held in Washington D.C.'s West Potomac Park, near the Potomac River, the Tidal Basin and the Franklin Delano Roosevelt Memorial, along a road between the Lincoln and Jefferson Memorials. The University of Maryland was the overall competition winner.

The sixth Solar Decathlon took place on October 3–13, 2013, in Orange County Great Park in Irvine, California – it was the first Solar Decathlon to take place outside Washington D.C., and was won by Vienna University of Technology (Team Austria).

The seventh Solar Decathlon was held October 8 – 18, 2015, also at the Orange County Great Park. Stevens Institute of Technology was the overall winner. This was their third Solar Decathlon competition.

The eighth Solar Decathlon in the U.S. was held October 5–15, 2017, in Denver, Colorado, at the 61st & Peña Station on the University of Colorado A line commuter rail connecting Denver International Airport to downtown Union Station. Eleven teams competed to design, build, and operate the most cost-effective, energy-efficient, and attractive solar-powered house. The Swiss Team won the overall competition with their entry, NeighborHub. It was the first entry for this combined team of École Polytechnique Fédérale de Lausanne, School of Engineering and Architecture Fribourg, Geneva University of Art and Design, and the University of Fribourg.

In March 2025, early in the 2nd Trump presidency, the DOE renamed the U.S. competition to BuildingsNEXT Student Design competition.

=== Awards ===
In 2010, the National Building Museum awarded the Solar Decathlon an Honor Award for its emphasis on "renewable energy, energy-efficient, and environmentally responsible systems" and its role in "educating a new generation of built-environment professionals".

== Scope of contests ==
Like the Olympic decathlon, the DOE Solar Decathlon consists of 10 contests. The contests evaluate cost-effective design; innovation balanced with market potential; water and energy efficiency; energy production and time-of-use energy; and communications strategies. Each Solar Decathlon contest is worth a maximum of 100 points, for a potential competition total of 1,000 points. Teams earn points through task completion, performance monitoring, and jury evaluation. The contests may change after each competition in response to participant feedback, market dynamics, and DOE goals.

The contests for the 2019-2020 event:

- Energy Performance
- Engineering
- Financial Feasibility and Affordability
- Resilience
- Architecture
- Operations
- Market Potential
- Comfort and Environmental Quality
- Innovation
- Presentation

== Competitors ==
=== 2017 ===
The project NeighborHub by the Swiss team won the overall competition.

Teams selected for the Solar Decathlon 2017 competition held in Denver, Colorado:

- Georgia Tech: Georgia Institute of Technology (Atlanta, GA) The Georgia Tech team withdrew from the competition on November 22, 2016.
- Las Vegas: University of Nevada, Las Vegas (Las Vegas, NV)
- Maryland: University of Maryland (College Park, MD)
- Missouri S&T: Missouri University of Science and Technology (Rolla, MO)
- Netherlands: HU University of Applied Science Utrecht (Utrecht, Netherlands)
- Northwestern: Northwestern University (Evanston, IL)
- Swiss Team: École Polytechnique Fédérale de Lausanne, School of Engineering and Architecture Fribourg, University of Applied Sciences and Arts, Geneva, and the University of Fribourg (Lausanne, Switzerland and Fribourg, Switzerland)
- Team Alabama: University of Alabama at Birmingham; University of Alabama, Huntsville; and Calhoun Community College (Birmingham, AL, Huntsville, AL and Tanner, AL)
- Team Daytona Beach: Embry-Riddle Aeronautical University and Daytona State College (Daytona Beach, FL)
- UC Berkeley: University of California at Berkeley (Berkeley, CA)
- UC Davis: University of California, Davis (Davis, CA)
- WashU: Washington University in St. Louis (St. Louis, MO)
- Washington State: Washington State University (Pullman, WA) The Washington State team withdrew from the competition in September 2017, just before the time to transport the house to the competition.
- West Virginia: West Virginia University (Morgantown, WV) The West Virginia University team withdrew from Solar Decathlon 2017 in April 2017, after completing many rigorous competition deliverables, including construction drawings.

=== 2015 ===
Teams selected for the Solar Decathlon 2015 competition held at Orange County Great Park in Irvine, California:

- California Polytechnic State University (San Luis Obispo, CA)

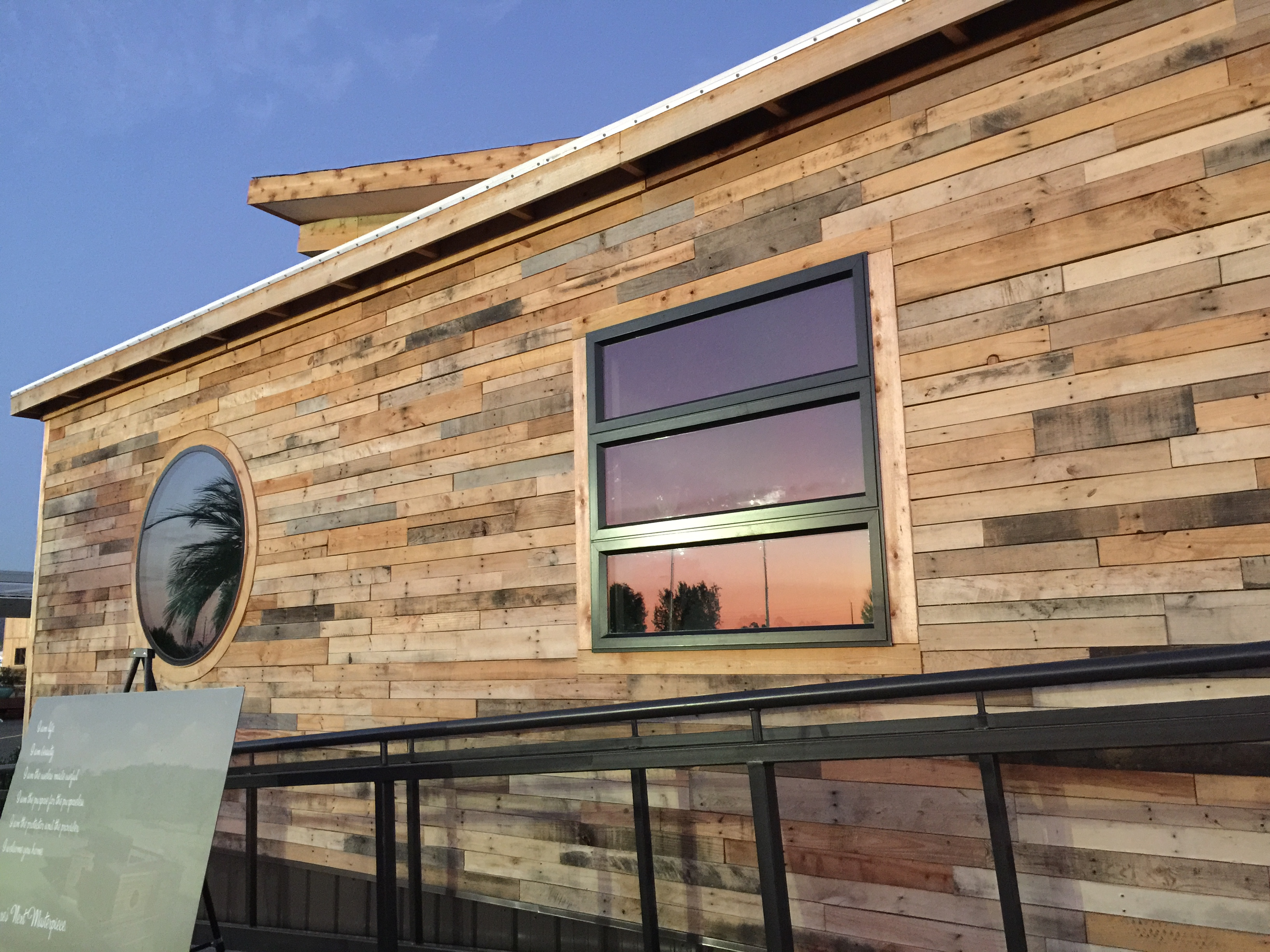
Just as birds use materials from their environment to build a nest, Missouri University of Science and Technology reused common materials to build its U.S. Department of Energy Solar Decathlon 2015 entry.

- California State University, Sacramento (Sacramento, CA)
- Clemson University (Clemson, SC)
- Crowder College (Neosho, MO) and Drury University (Springfield, MO)
- Missouri University of Science and Technology (Rolla, MO)
- New York City College of Technology (New York, NY)
- State University of New York at Alfred College of Technology and Alfred University (Alfred, NY)
- Stevens Institute of Technology (Hoboken, NJ) winner 2015
- University of Florida, National University of Singapore, and Santa Fe College
- The University of Texas at Austin and Technische Universitaet Muenchen
- University at Buffalo, The State University of New York
- University of California, Davis
- University of California, Irvine; Chapman University; Irvine Valley College and Saddleback College
- Vanderbilt University and Middle Tennessee State University
- West Virginia University and University of Roma Tor Vergata
- Western New England University, Universidad Tecnológica de Panamá, and Universidad Tecnológica Centroamericana

=== 2013 ===
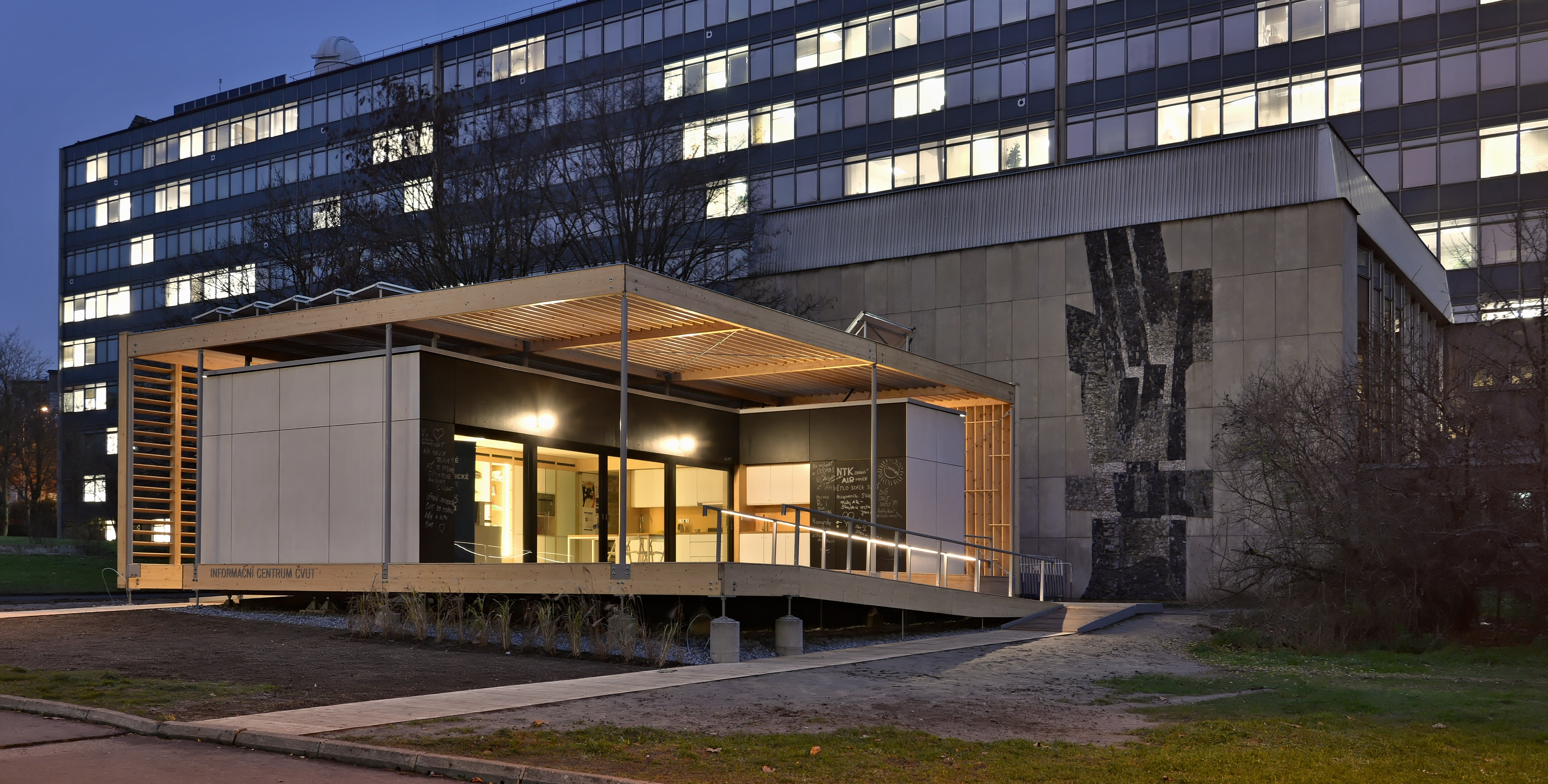
AIR House of Czech Technical University team. in 2014 rebuilt in Prague as the Information Centre of the CTU

Teams selected for the Solar Decathlon 2013 competition in Orange County Great Park in Irvine, California, the first one to be held outside of Washington, DC,:

- Arizona State University and The University of New Mexico (Tempe, Arizona, and Albuquerque, New Mexico)
- Czech Technical University (Prague, Czech Republic)
- Hampton University and Old Dominion University (Hampton and Norfolk, Virginia)
- Middlebury College (Middlebury, Vermont)
- Missouri University of Science and Technology (Rolla, Missouri)
- Norwich University (Northfield, Vermont)
- Queen's University, Carleton University, and Algonquin College (Kingston and Ottawa, Ontario, Canada)
- Santa Clara University (Santa Clara, California)
- Southern California Institute of Architecture and California Institute of Technology (Los Angeles, California)
- Stanford University (Palo Alto, California)
- Stevens Institute of Technology (Hoboken, New Jersey)
- The Catholic University of America, George Washington University, and American University (Washington, DC)
- The University of North Carolina at Charlotte (Charlotte, North Carolina)
- The University of Texas at El Paso and El Paso Community College (El Paso, Texas)
- University of Calgary (Calgary, Alberta, Canada)
- University of Louisville, Ball State University and University of Kentucky (Louisville, Kentucky; Muncie, Indiana; and Lexington, Kentucky)
- University of Nevada Las Vegas (Las Vegas, Nevada)
- University of Southern California (Los Angeles, California)
- Vienna University of Technology (Vienna, Austria) winner 2013
- West Virginia University (Morgantown, West Virginia)

=== 2011 ===
Teams selected for the Solar Decathlon 2011 competition:

- Appalachian State University (team page)
- Florida International University (team page)
- Middlebury College (team page )
- New Zealand: Victoria University of Wellington (team page)
- The Ohio State University (team page)
- Parsons The New School for Design, Milano The New School for Management and Urban Policy, and Stevens Institute of Technology (team page)
- Purdue University (team page)
- The Southern California Institute of Architecture and California Institute of Technology (team page)
- Team Belgium: Ghent University (team page)
- Team Canada: University of Calgary (team page)
- Team China: Tongji University (team page)
- Team Florida: Florida State University, the University of Central Florida, the University of Florida, and the University of South Florida (team page)
- Team Massachusetts: Massachusetts College of Art and Design and the University of Massachusetts Lowell (team page)
- Team New Jersey: Rutgers - The State University of New Jersey and New Jersey Institute of Technology (team page)
- Team New York: The City College of New York (team page)
- Tidewater Virginia: Old Dominion University and Hampton University (team page)
- University of Hawaii (team page)*On June 1, 2011, the U.S. Department of Energy received formal notification from the *University of Hawaii of its withdrawal from Solar Decathlon 2011.
- University of Illinois at Urbana-Champaign (team page)
- University of Maryland (team page) winner 2011
- The University of Tennessee (team page)

=== 2009 ===
The competing teams in Solar Decathlon 2009:

- Cornell University (team page)
- Iowa State University (team page)
- Penn State (team page)
- Rice University (team page)
- Team Alberta: University of Calgary, SAIT Polytechnic, Alberta College of Art and Design, and Mount Royal College (team page)
- Team Boston: Boston Architectural College and Tufts University (team page)
- Team California: Santa Clara University and California College of the Arts (team page)
- Team Germany: Technische Universität Darmstadt (team page) winner 2009
- Team Missouri: Missouri University of Science and Technology and University of Missouri (team page)
- Team Ontario/BC: University of Waterloo, Ryerson University, and Simon Fraser University (team page)
- Team Spain: Universidad Politécnica de Madrid (team page)
- Ohio State University (team page)
- The University of Arizona (team page)
- Universidad de Puerto Rico (team page)
- University of Illinois at Urbana-Champaign (team page)
- University of Kentucky (team page)
- University of Louisiana at Lafayette (team page)
- University of Minnesota (team page)
- University of Wisconsin–Milwaukee (team page)
- Virginia Tech (team page)

=== 2007 ===
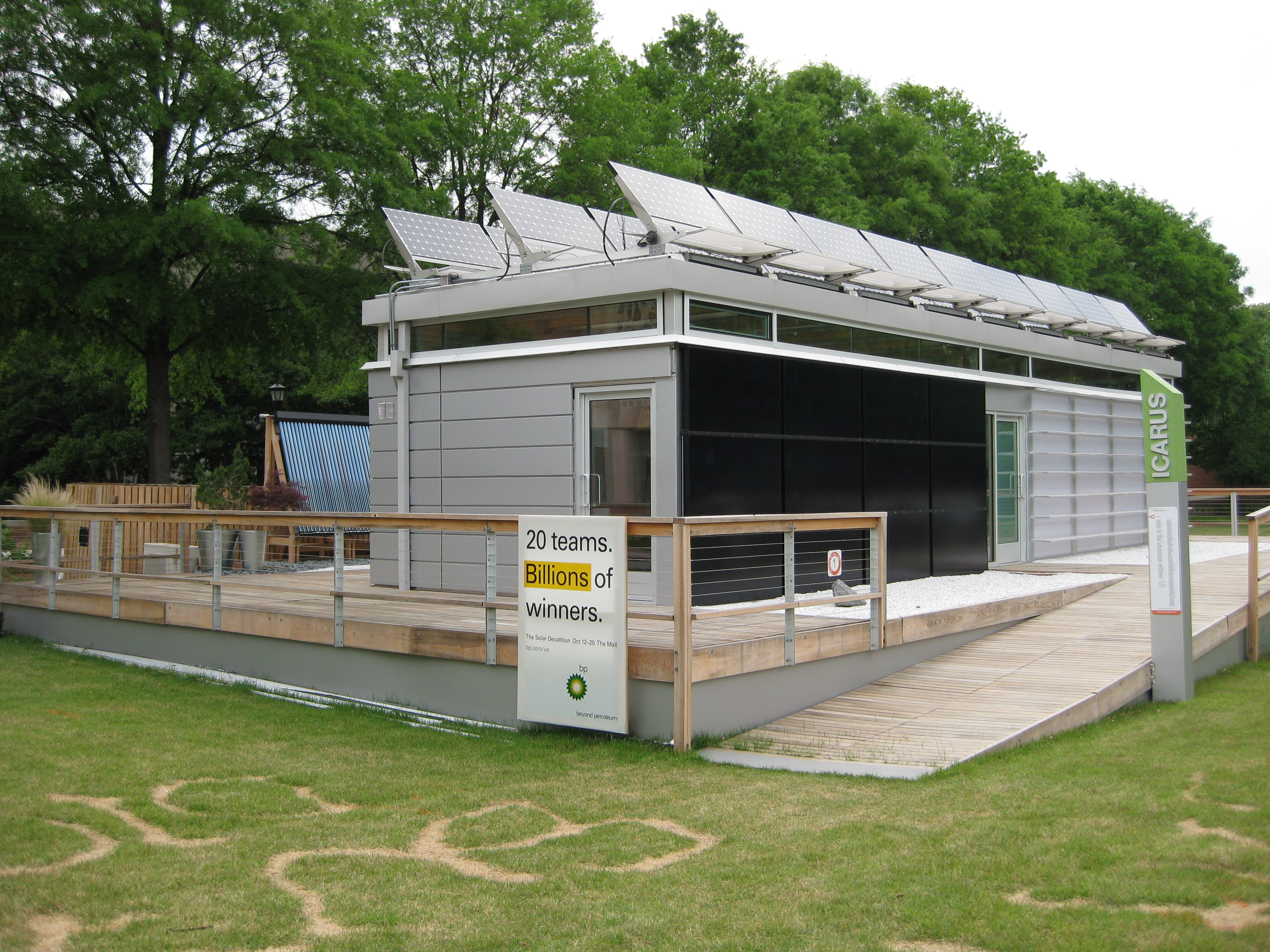
Georgia Tech's entry to Solar Decathlon 2007, located on Tech campus.

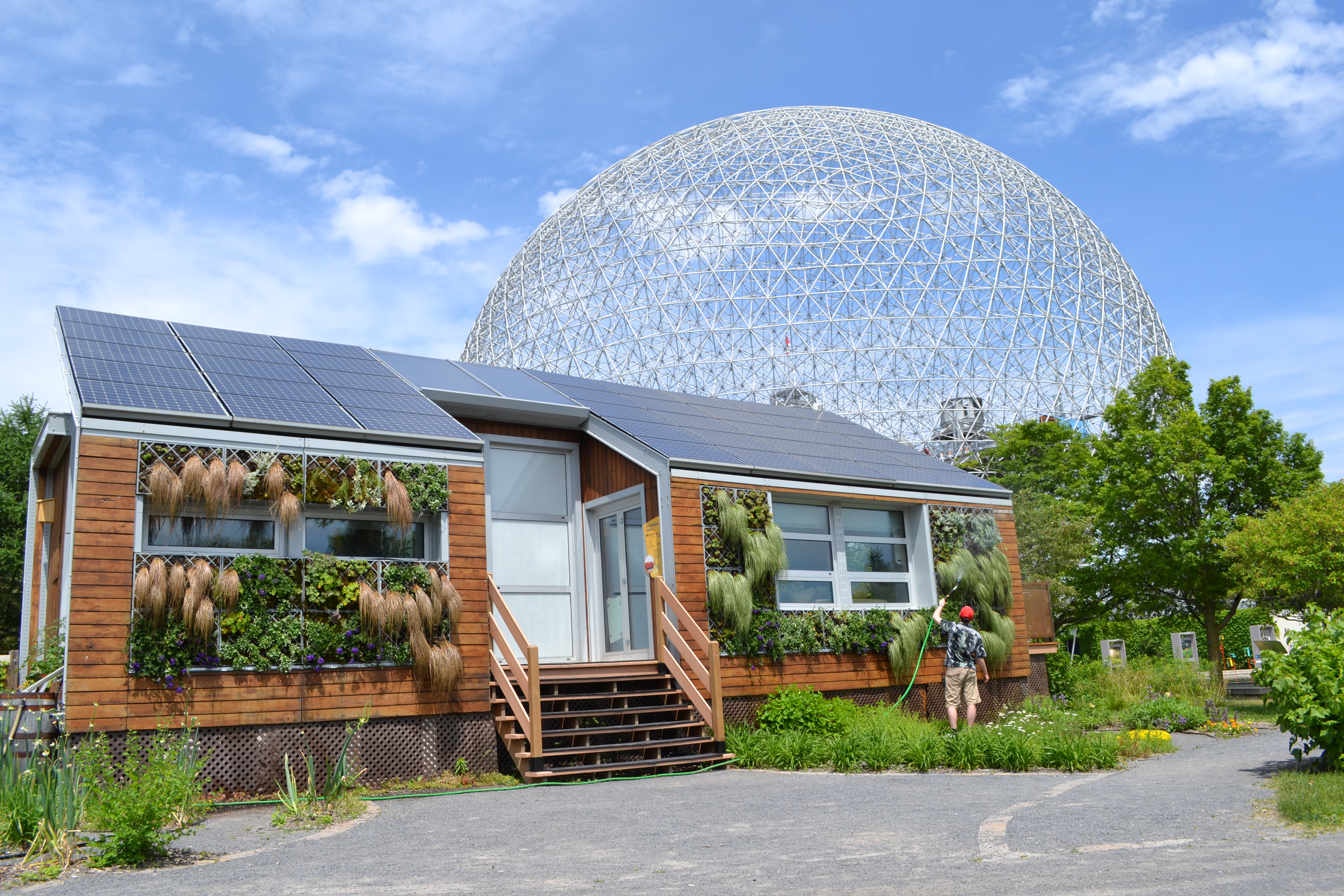
Team Montréal: École de Technologie Supérieure, Université de Montréal, and McGill University

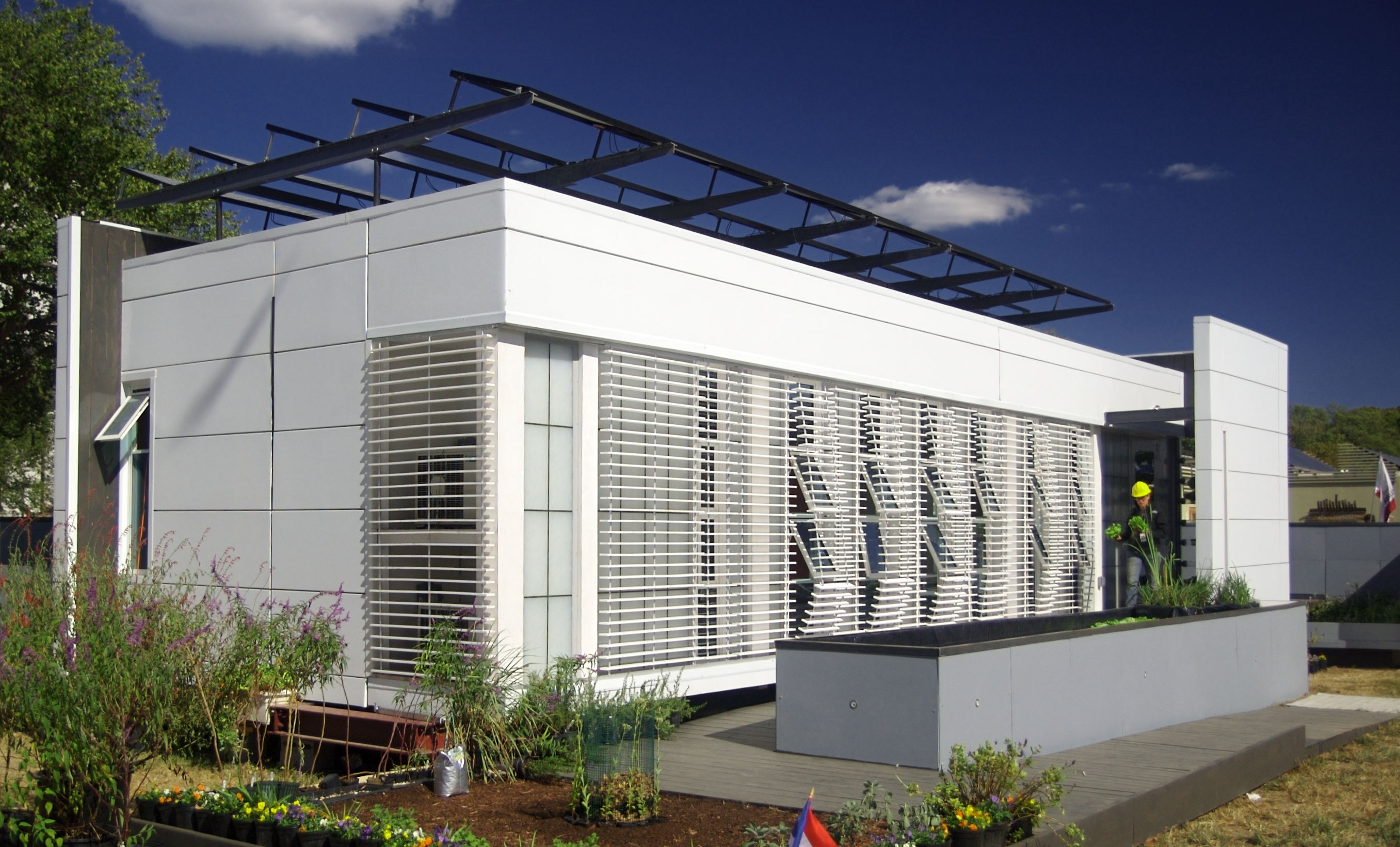
University of Puerto Rico

The 20 competing teams in Solar Decathlon 2007:

- Carnegie Mellon University (team page)
- Cornell University (team page)
- Georgia Institute of Technology (team page)
- Kansas Project Solar House: Kansas State University and University of Kansas (team page)
- Lawrence Technological University (team page)
- Massachusetts Institute of Technology (team page)
- New York Institute of Technology (team page)
- Penn State University (team page)
- Santa Clara University (team page)
- University of Illinois at Urbana-Champaign (team page)
- Team Montréal: École de Technologie Supérieure, Université de Montréal, and McGill University (team page)
- Technische Universität Darmstadt (team page) winner 2007
- Texas A&M University (team page)
- Universidad Politécnica de Madrid (team page)
- Universidad de Puerto Rico (team page)
- University of Cincinnati (team page)
- University of Colorado at Boulder (team page)
- University of Maryland (team page)
- University of Missouri-Rolla (now Missouri S&T) (team page)
- University of Texas at Austin (team page)

=== 2005 ===
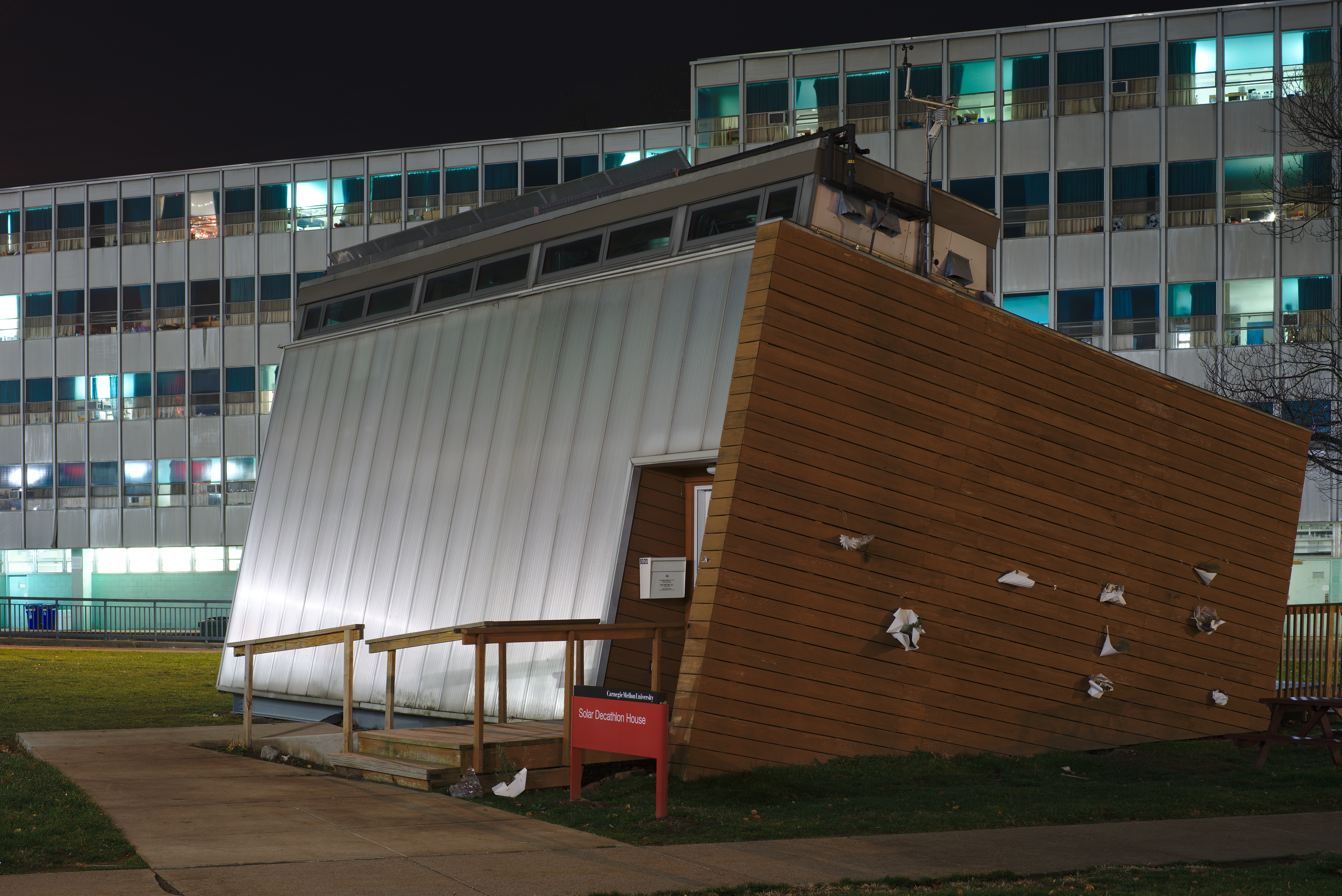
Pittsburgh Synergy Solar Decathlon House at Carnegie Mellon University.

The 18 competing universities in Solar Decathlon 2005:

- California Polytechnic State University
- Canadian Solar Decathlon: Concordia University and Université de Montréal
- Cornell University (team page)
- Crowder College
- Florida International University
- New York Institute of Technology (team page)
- Pittsburgh Synergy: Carnegie Mellon University, University of Pittsburgh, and the Art Institute of Pittsburgh (team page)
- Rhode Island School of Design
- Universidad de Puerto Rico
- Universidad Politécnica de Madrid (team page)
- University of Colorado, Denver and Boulder winner 2005
- University of Maryland (team page)
- University of Massachusetts Dartmouth
- University of Michigan
- University of Missouri–Rolla (now Missouri S&T) and Rolla Technical Institute (team page)
- University of Texas at Austin (UT SolarD team page)
- Virginia Tech (team page)
- Washington State University

=== 2002 ===
The 14 competing teams in Solar Decathlon 2002:

- Auburn University
- Carnegie Mellon
- Crowder College
- Texas A&M University
- Tuskegee University
- University of Colorado at Boulder winner 2002
- University of Delaware
- University of Maryland(team page)
- University of Missouri–Rolla (now Missouri S&T) and Rolla Technical Institute (team page)
- University of North Carolina at Charlotte
- Universidad de Puerto Rico
- University of Texas at Austin
- University of Virginia (team page)
- Virginia Tech

== See also ==
- Solar Decathlon Africa
- Solar Decathlon China
- Solar Decathlon Europe
- Solar Decathlon Latin America and Caribbean
- Energy conservation
- Green building
- Leadership in Energy and Environmental Design, a U.S. certification for sustainable architecture
- Low-energy house
- Sustainable architecture
