= Technical University of Civil Engineering of Bucharest =

Coordinates: 44.463505°N 26.124735°E

Technical University of Civil Engineering Bucharest
- Universitatea Tehnică de Construcţii din București
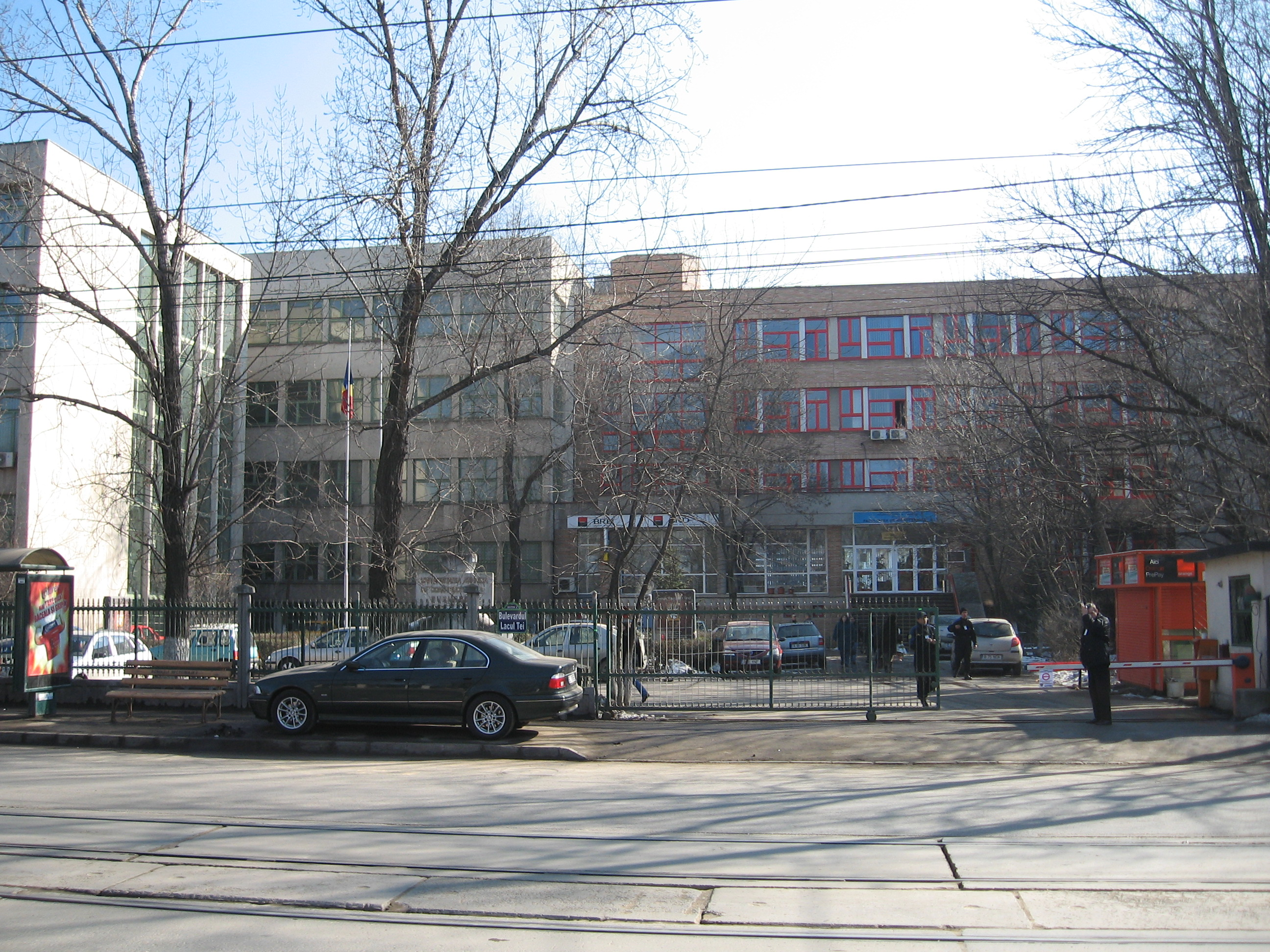
- Former name: Civil Engineering Institute of Bucharest (1948–1994)
- Type: Public
- Established: 1948; 78 years ago 1864 - School of Bridges and Roads, Mines and Architecture
- Rector: Radu Sorin Văcăreanu
- Faculty: 540
- Students: 8,600
- Location: Bucharest, Romania
- Campus: Urban
- Website: www.utcb.ro
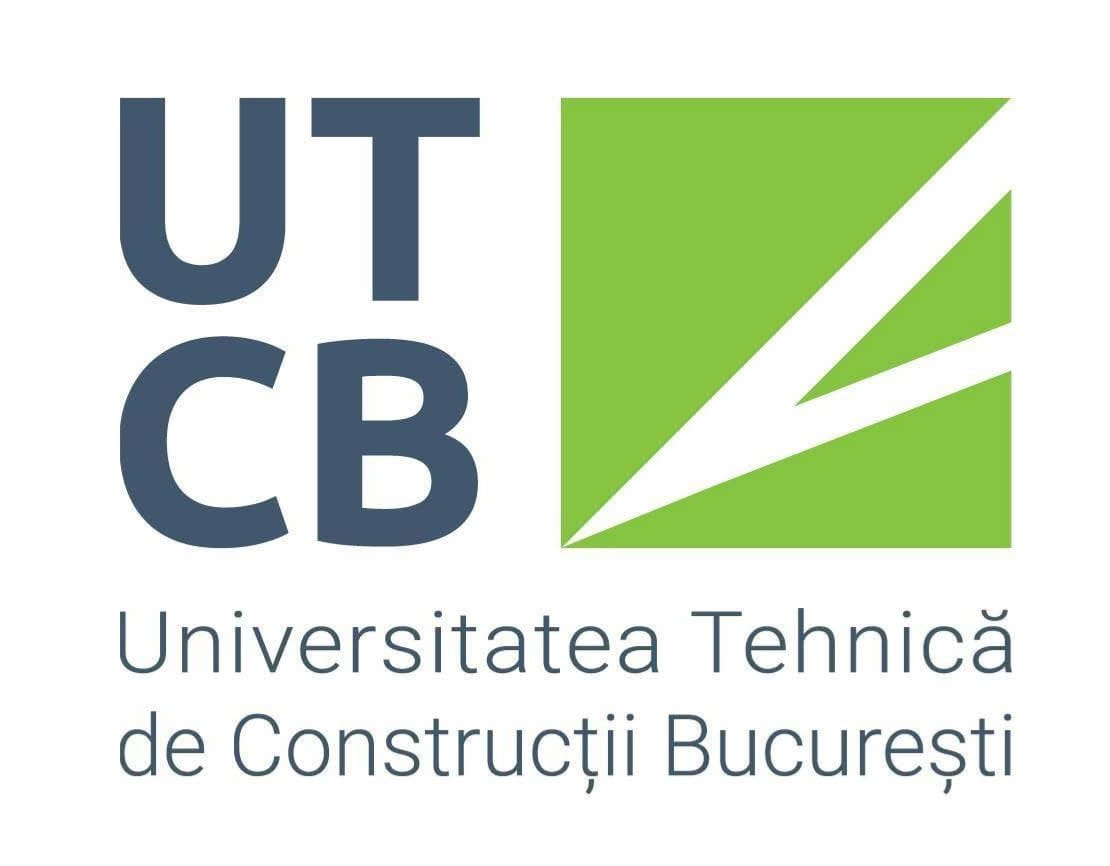

The Technical University of Civil Engineering Bucharest (Romanian: Universitatea Tehnică de Construcții din București (UTCB)) is a public university in Bucharest, Romania, founded in 1948. It was formerly known as the Institute of Civil Engineering of Bucharest.

UTCB is a member of the Romanian Alliance of Technical Universities (ARUT).

== Academics ==
Technical University of Civil Engineering is organized into 7 faculties and one department. The university offers 4-year programmes, awarding the degree of Bachelor of Science (Engineer), and graduate/postgraduate programmes awarding the degrees of Master (2-year programmes) and Doctorate/PhD (3-year programmes).
