= Moncada, Spain =

Moncada Moncada (Spanish) Montcada (Valencian)
- Municipality
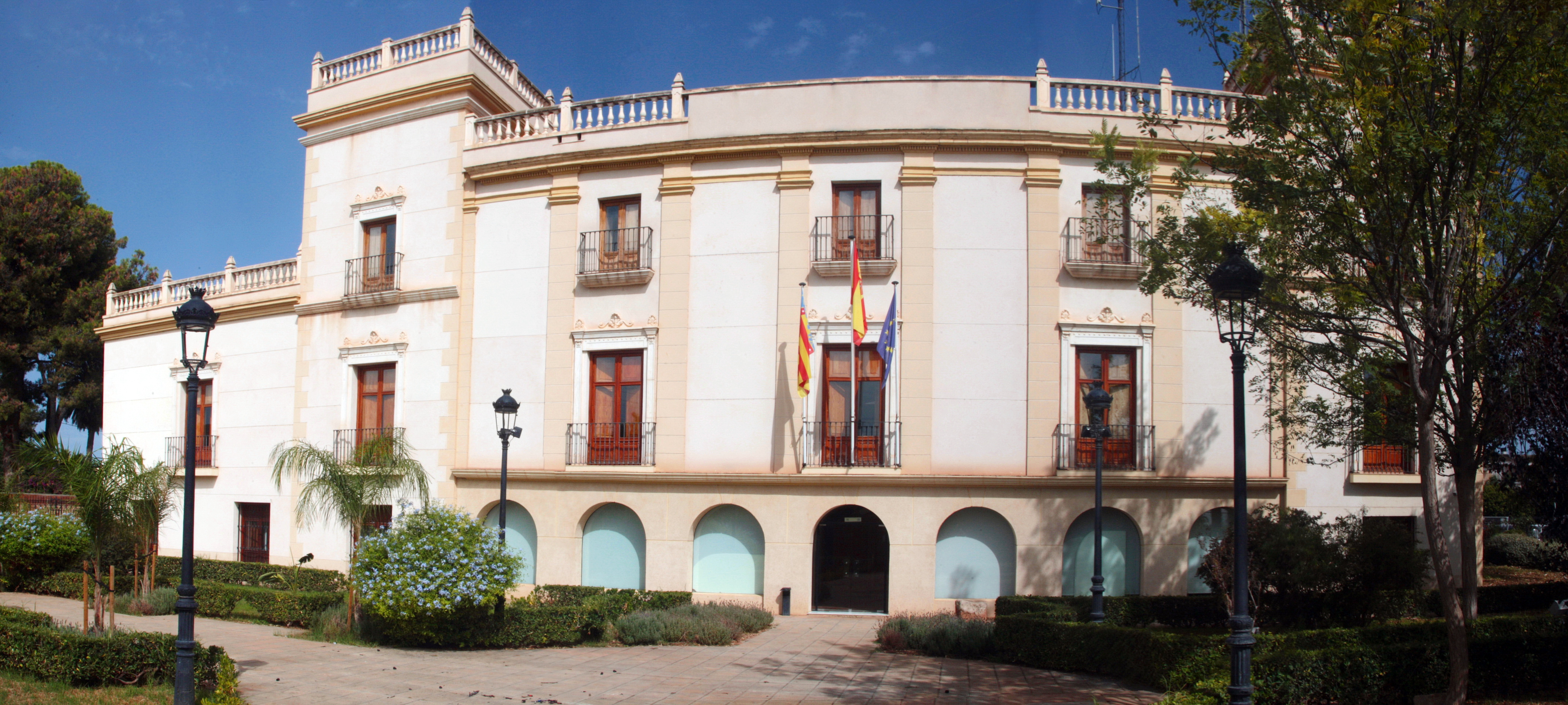
- Town hall

- Coat of arms

- Location in Spain Moncada (Valencian Community) Moncada (Spain)
- Coordinates: 39°32′35″N 0°23′34″W
- Country: Spain
- Autonomous community: Valencian Community
- Province: Valencia
- Comarca: Horta Nord
- Judicial district: Moncada

Government
  - Alcalde: Amparo Orts Albiach (PSOE)

Area
  - Total: 15.6 km^{2} (6.0 sq mi)
- Elevation: 37 m (121 ft)

Population (2025-01-01)
  - Total: 22,213
  - Density: 1,420/km^{2} (3,690/sq mi)
- Demonym(s): Moncadense/a, Moncanero/a
- Time zone: UTC+1 (CET)
  - Summer (DST): UTC+2 (CEST)
- Postal code: 46113
- Official language(s): Spanish and Valencian
- Website: Official website

Moncada (Spanish: [moŋˈkaða]; Valencian: Montcada [moŋˈkaða], also [moŋˈkaː]) is a municipality in the comarca of Horta Nord in the Valencian Community, Spain.

== Place names ==
On the official writings in Latin Monscatanus was used, from mons ('mountain') and Celtic catanus ('juniper'?), making Montcada the correct original spelling and Moncada a vulgarization of the name. However, officially the town's name is written Moncada, but also in Valencian accept dual Montcada/Moncada denomination, as the origin of the name is linked from the 13th century to the lineage of the House of Montcada, although the removal of the letter t dates from the 15th century, where previously, the Moncada form was used in the earliest known documents relating to the Royal Séquia of the municipality, this denomination coming from the vulgar pronunciation, simplified by omitting the letter t. Moreover, government agencies on language as the Valencian Academy of Language always use Montcada in Valencian to refer to the name of the municipality of Valencia.

== Geography ==
The relief of the municipality is formed by a quaternary plain on the gently rising in the northern and western parts of Tertiary hills, an extension of the Sierra Calderona, and reaching its highest point in Tos Pelat (92 m) hill situated on the border between the terms of Bétera, Valencia and Moncada. The hills extend to the town center that has already begun to occupy the hill of Santa Barbara.

The Carraixet Ravine penetrates by northwest and cuts across the term to go out by southeast, along Alfara del Patriarca.

=== Neighborhoods and districts ===
The urban environment is the core of Moncada, together with the following population centers:

- Moncada

- Barrio de los Dolores

- San Isidro de Benagéber

- Barrio del Pilar

- Masíass

=== Bordering towns ===
The municipality of Moncada borders the following locations: Albalat dels Sorells, Alfara del Patriarca, Bétera, Foios, Museros, Náquera and Valencia, all of the Province of Valencia.

== History ==
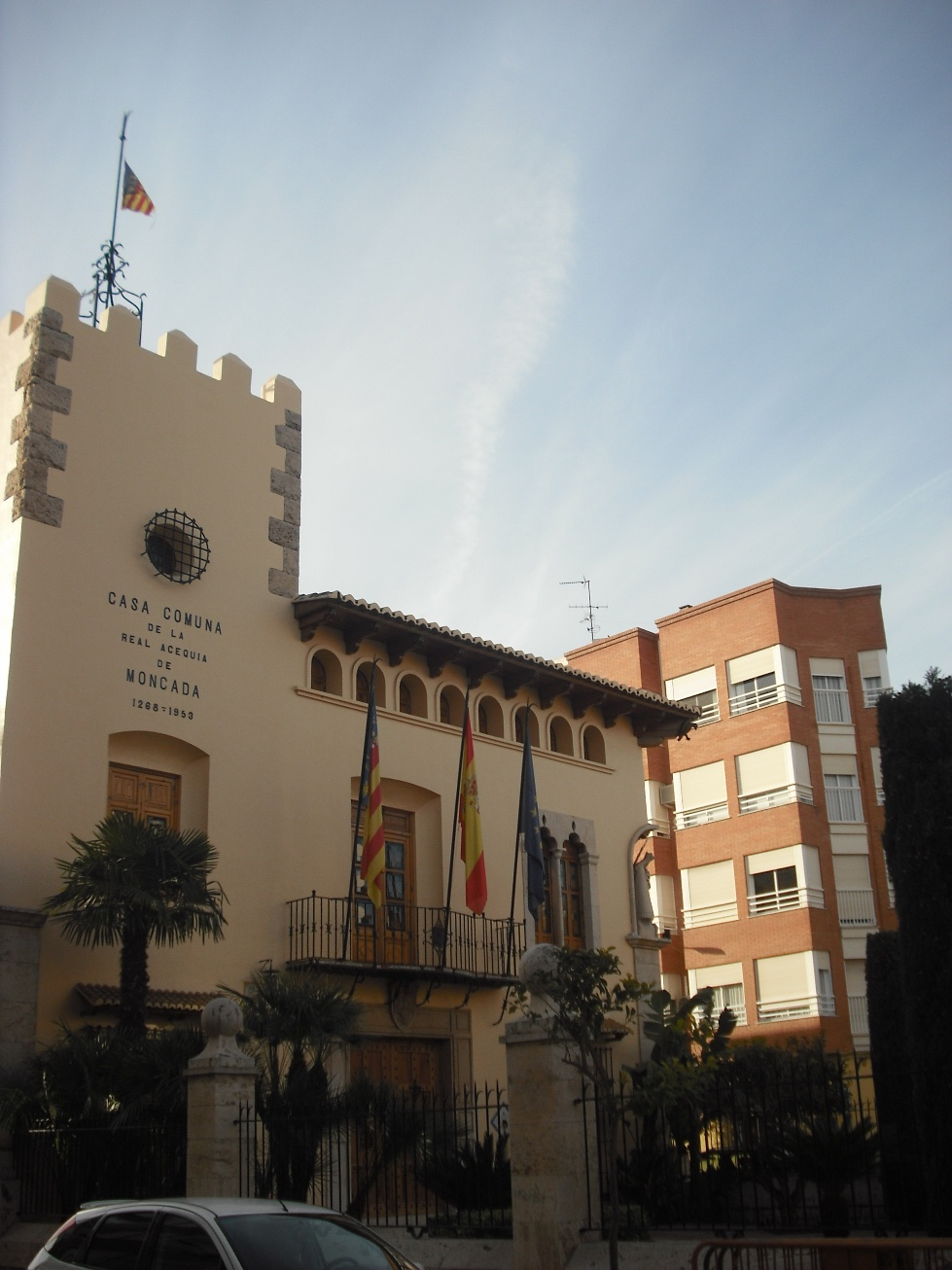
Commune House of the Royal Acequia de Moncada.

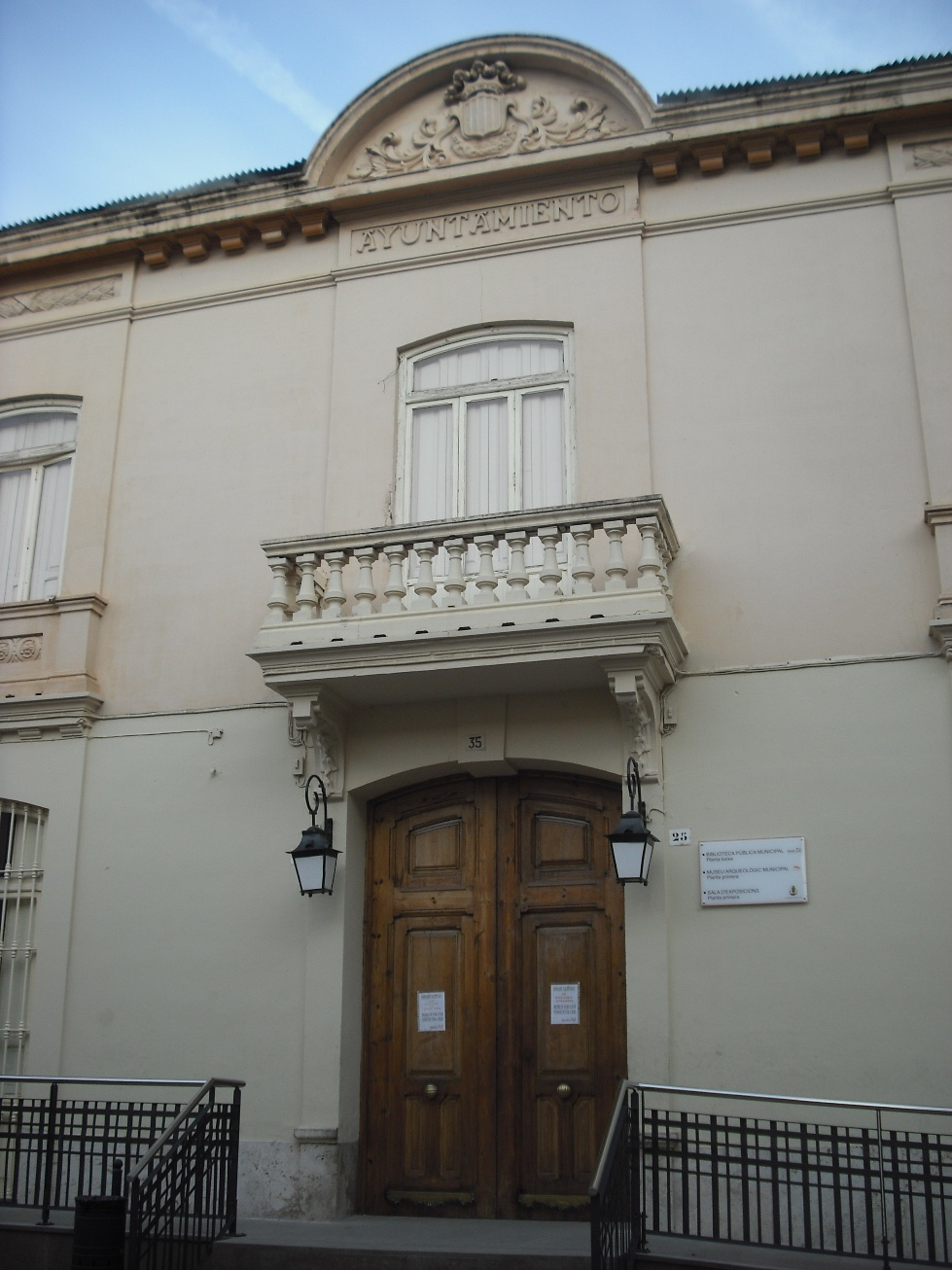
Old City Hall, which houses the library and the archaeological museum.

The territory of the municipality of Moncada was the subject of an intense human occupation from the early days of Romanization. There are few data we have from earlier times. In the area known as the Xop and in some fields for extraction of clay for pottery, appeared a few fragments of ceramic belonging to handmade vessels and two arrowheads. Also before the Roman times is the Iberian settlement of Tos Pelat, which remaining parts of its walled town and were seen sections of the walls of the rooms, and were for a long time been collected fragments of Iberian vessels with geometric decoration painted and even whole pieces. We know the existence of two large rustic Roman villas, one in the departure of Pou or Pousaig and the other in the departure of Bordellet. By the characteristics of the collected materials, both towns should to blossom during the 2nd and early 3rd centuries AD.

The origin of the population is attributed to the Iberian or Roman period, due to the archaeological materials found in its term. King James I in 1239 granted to the inhabitants of the conquered lands of Valencia, of all water and major medium and minor irrigation ditches, but literally and expressly reserved the channel that was called Real, that it was going to Puzol, better known as the "Royal Ditch of Moncada" that irrigates most of the left bank of the River Turia, from Paterna to Puçol. It extended the boundaries of irrigation on the twenty towns and thirteen districts that conform the irrigable area of the Royal Ditch of Moncada, specifically the populations of Quart de Poblet, Paterna, Burjassot, Godella, Rocafort, Moncada, Alfara of the Patriarch, Vinalesa, Bonrepos and Mirambell, Almàssera, Foios, Meliana, Albalat dels Sorells, Museros, Albuixech, Massalfassar, Massamagrell, La Pobla de Farnals, Rafelbuñol, El Puig and Puzol, and the hamlets of Benimàmet, Beniferri, Masarrojos, Benifaraig, Carpesa, Borbotó, Casas de Bárcena, Mahuella, Tauladella, Rafalell and Vistabella.

The first written documentation come from, however, of the time of the Catalan conquest. Some years later, Moncada returned to crown and was changed to the Order of the Temple by the Farmhouse of Ruzafa in 1246 (to have greater strategic value by keeping the southern flank of the capital of the Kingdom). In 1248 the commander of the Templars granted Municipal corporation Population Charter and about in the same time was created the bailiff of Moncada, one of the richest of the Order of the Temple, and after the Order of Montesa, which was passed after being suppressed in the early 14th century.

During the War of Succession in 1706, Moncada was occupied by the Bourbon army. This occupation lasted short time as Basset, Austracist general, forced it to raise its reals.

After the Spanish Civil War, the city suffered a widespread destruction during the conflict and Salvador Rodrigo Rosalen is left in front of City Hall.

=== Moncada Islamic Necropolis ===
In 1996 to realize the excavations for the foundations of a house in Barreres street were found seven human burials pointing to an Islamic origin; Islamic culture were dated between the 11th and 13th centuries. Located archaeologically the location of the Islamic necropolis, the subsequent discovery in 2006 of some silos and the remains of two houses in The Ravalet, dating from the Almohad period (12th century), allowed the archaeological finding Islamic origin or previous of the city.

Between November 2006 and January 2007 in San Roque Street, following the demolition of a house, they found 25 to 30 bodies of young people in good condition and a few babies in almost good condition, dating from around the 12th century. Some showing large head injuries, which were shattered by impacts. It is presumed that the bodies found professed the Muslim religion by the way in which lay buried.

In early 2006, were found traces of the Moorish occupation, in what some experts have dubbed "the hamlet of Moncada" next to the Palace of the Counts of Rótova, current city council of the Municipality of Moncada. This finding corresponds to a first level. In the second level were found houses dating from the 16th century.

== Demography ==
Moncada has a population of 21,847 inhabitants in 2010.

== Economy ==
Moncada's economy, as well as the other towns in the Valencia region of l'Horta, is mostly agricultural, due to the favourable location and the fertility of the soil in the area. Despite the dominance of the primary sector, Moncada has experienced over the last years a significant growth in the tertiary sector, caused primarily by strong demand in the hospitality sector arising from the close presence of the Cardenal Herrera CEU University, whose influx of students has served as a stimulus for the modest local hotel industry.

== Transportation ==
The easiest way to reach Moncada is from the city of Valencia through the CV-308.

Moncada has three stations of Metro Valencia (Moncada-Alfara, Seminar-CEU and Masias).

It also has a bus to Valencia and intercity bus service connecting the town of Moncada with its various neighborhoods.

== Notable buildings ==
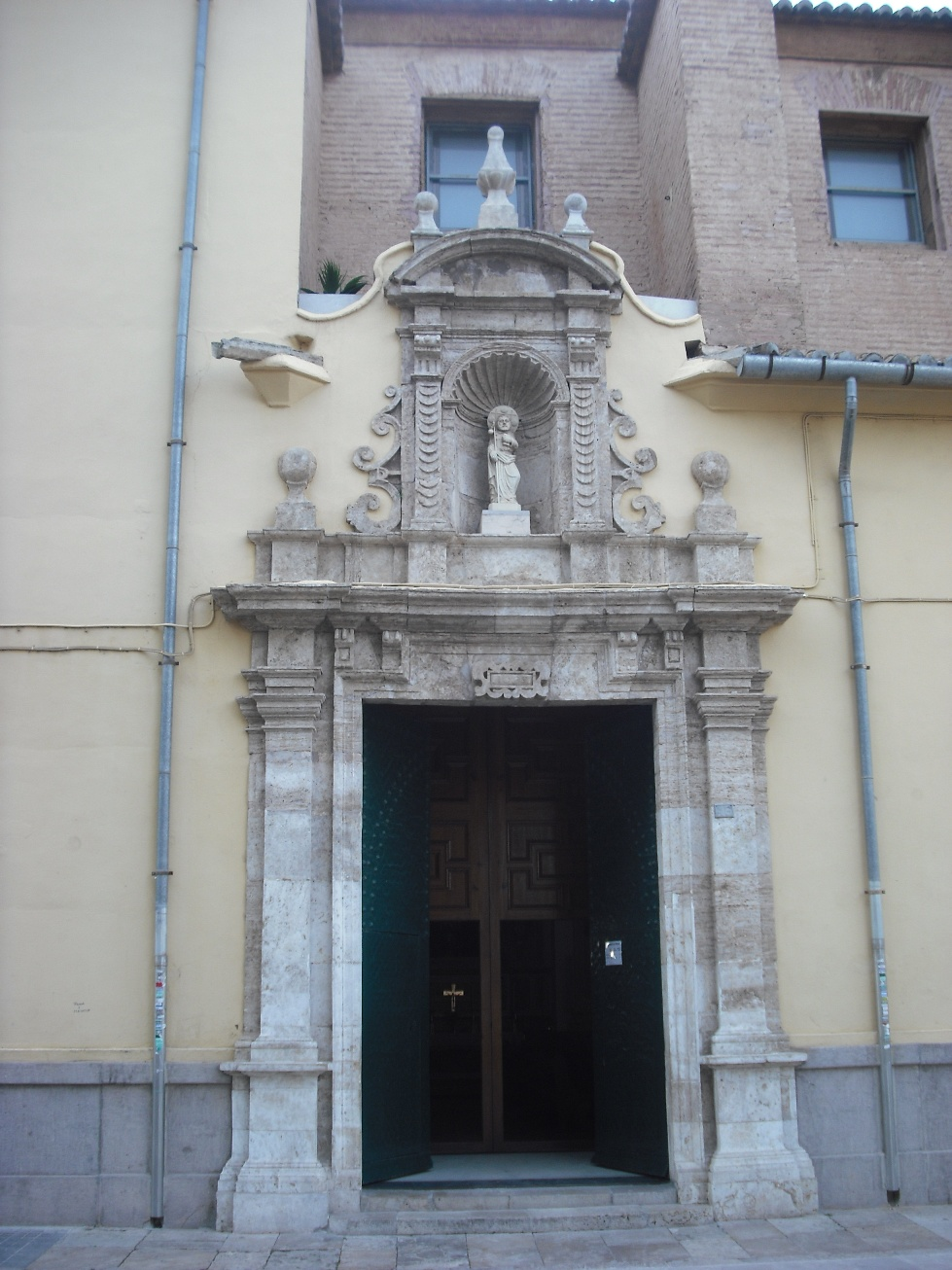
Gate Church of San Jaime.

- Church of Saint James. Temple consecrated in 1696. It is rectangular and its interior has undergone numerous reforms, according to prevailing styles and tastes in each historical period.
- Hermitage de Saint Barbara. Built in the early 18th century, which is dedicated to its patron Saint Barbara, is based on another earlier chapel to smaller proportions dedicated to San Ponce.
- Old Market. Located in Maestre Palau Square in its 4 corners, was built in 1908. The surface is raised 50 cm above the street level. Its roof is made of zinc plates over an iron framework and supported by columns of the same metal. In this market on Monday was selling various animals and food products supplying a dozen surrounding towns agricultural activities derived from farming and ranching and practiced since the 18th century, together with other occupations (quarries, production of bricks, flour ...) have resulted a significant contribution to the agricultural wealth of the territory.
- City Hall. Until 1997, the City council was located in what was the town hall, rebuilt in 1911. Then moved to the restored Palace of the Counts of Rótova. The palace, located in the old core of Moncada, in The Ravalet area, was purchased by the City council of Moncada for public use. The building dates from the late 18th century, baroque architecture in the initial phase, with subsequent interventions witch ended deriving in neoclassical style. This palace was in ruins after having had different uses at different times, from serving as a summer residence of the Counts of Rótova, to be used as a private psychiatric hospital in the postwar years. In times of Carlist wars, the building played an important role, given the location at the entrance of the town. Towards the 70 housed a community of monks Comboni, then was completely abandoned. It was the council's decision to acquire the property, as a formula to halt its deterioration.
- Metropolitan Seminary of Valencia. Located between the city and Carraixet Ravine. This seminar is currently occupied by the CEU Foundation, which has arranged at the resort facilities of the Private University Cardenal Herrera (UCH-CEU) which also include the neighboring town of Alfara del Patriarca and the facilities of the private school Saint Paul, belonging to the same foundation, so that both populations receive a large influx of students with their presence influence the proliferation of bars, restaurants and bookshops, as well as the empowerment for a housing market linked to college.
- Commune House. Unique building in imitation of an old Valencian farmhouse, is the headquarters of the community of The Royal Canal of Moncada.

== Festivals ==
- Festivities: Begin on August 28 with the presentation of the Queen of the festival and her Bridesmaids and end on September 10 with the festivity of the patron Apostle Saint James.
- Saint Barbara: It takes place on December 4, in which the people of Moncada celebrates its patron Saint Barbara. Saint Barbara's Day, around the shrine dedicated to her, is mounted the traditional fair of porrat, where you can buy the typical things like walnuts, nougat, porrat ...; also is made the pilgrimage to the chapel with the image of Saint Barbara where The Major Fallers of the town together with the Queen of the festival and their Bridesmaids. In the chapel a mass is celebrated in his honor. Is typical rise to the shrine to kiss the relic of Saint Barbara which is a piece of phalanx of a finger of the Martyr.
- Moncada Holy Week: During the celebration of Holy Week, in Moncada are made various religious representations around the mystery of the Passion.
- Magi, the parade takes place on January 5, as usual. Their Majesties the Kings begin their journey in large floats from Xátiva Street and culminates in the old town hall where he and the Mayor are directed to the Apostle St. James Church to deliver the baby Jesus the various gifts. In this massive parade involving various partners such as the Calvaries of Saint Vincent, Daughters of Mary, the Fallera Local Board, Queen and Ladies of the Festival, the Musical Arts Center, Musical Union of Moncada and Hellin-Moncada Drummers Association.
- Fallas: are held in March and apart from the Falleers committees, the Falleer Local Board with the Major Falleers of Moncada and the respective courts of honor, celebrate the typical Falleers' acts : Majors Falleers Exaltation, The "Crida", the Ninot cavalcade, parades, award ceremonies, wreath, mascletás and the burnt of the monuments. In this town 35 years ago that planted the first monument faller, which was responsible for the falla the Tauleta . In 1932 was created the first falla of Moncada, planted for 4 years where is now Commune House of the Royal Canal of Moncada, that at burst of The Civil War affect in the celebrations, preventing the organization of a stable committee until the creation of the Tauleta. With the progressive growth of the town the Commissions have also grown, reaching the ten that currently exist:

- Falla La Tauleta (1973)

- Falla El Mercat (1982)

- Falla Del Poble (1982)

- Falla Badia (1984)

- Falla Tos Pelat (1987)

- Falla Amics de Masies (1994)

- Falla El Palmar (1996)

- Falla Les Eres (1997)

- Falla El Campet (1997)

- Falla Archprieste Vila - Sant Enric (2000)

== Sport ==
The 2024 Vuelta a la Comunitat Valenciana Feminas passed through Moncada.

== Notable people ==
- Vicente Iborra, Spanish footballer
- Enith Salón, goalkeeper for the Spain national football team
- Miguel Tendillo, a Spanish retired professional footballer who played as a left back
- Juan Ramón Zapata, Spanish racing driver

== See also ==
- List of municipalities in Valencia
