= Carraixet =

Ravine in Valencia province, Spain

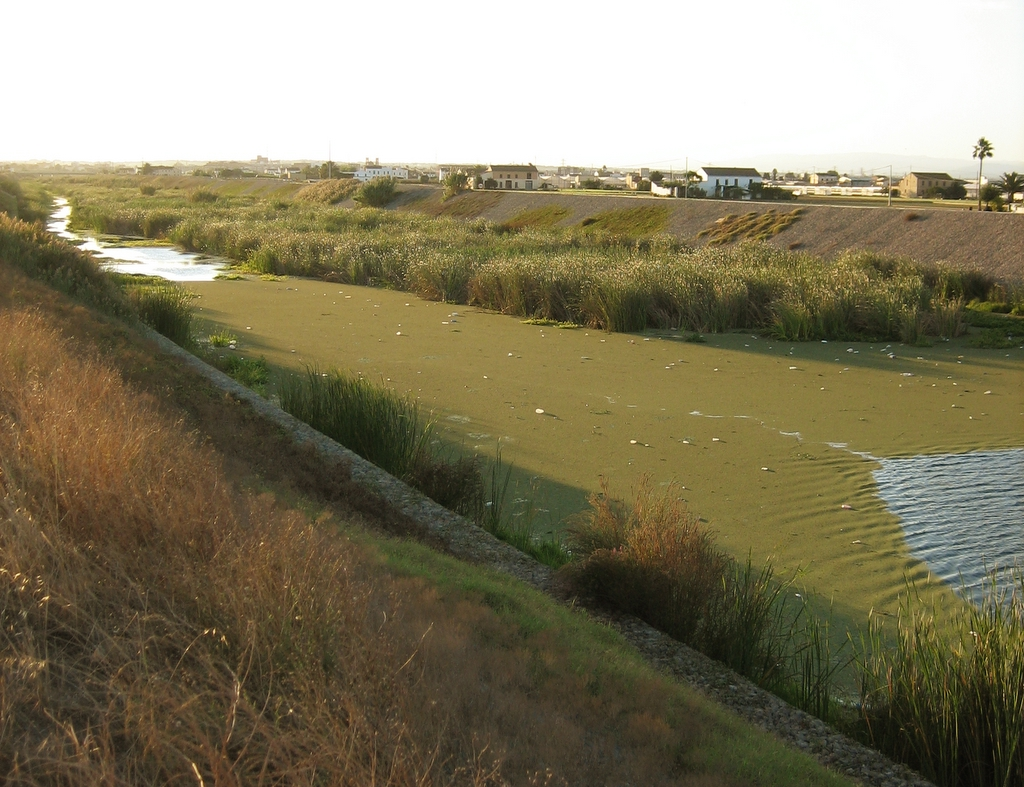
End area of Carraixet, near the sea in Alboraia

The Carraixet ravine is a course of water from the north of the Valencian province, in the Valencian Community (Spain). It begins in Gátova and collects waters from the sloped southern side of the Calderona mountain range. It flows into the Mediterranean Sea through the town of Alboraya. At its mouth, it is also called the Olocau ravine or the Peralvillo ravine. In the Book of the Facts (in Valencian: Llibre dels feits) James I named it riu Sec ("Dry river"), while discussing the Battle of the Puig.

== Course ==
The Carraixet ravine begins in the end of Gátova, to the west of the town. It collects waters from the south slope of the Calderona mountain range, from the sources of Alameda and Xarvilla. Afterwards, it passes through Olocau and flows in a south-eastern direction towards the end of Bétera, reaching its wide river bed. The Cirer and Náquera ravines join it from the left. It crosses further on in the end of Moncada and touches Alfara del Patriarca, and serves as the border between the municipalities. It has this function almost until its mouth. Like this, it passes by Foios and Vinalesa, where it hits the Palmaret Alto ravine. From here, and already channeled, it continues to the Valencian municipalities of Benifaraig and Carpesa. It hits Bonrepòs i Mirambell, and afterwards goes east. It goes through Tavernes Blanques, a town that is on the right bank. At this height the shrine of the Virgin of the Abandoned can be found next to the channel. This shrine was reconstructed and reformed in the same place that it was in 1447, next to the place where they buried the executed. The ancient road of Valencia to Barcelona crosses the ravine here. It enters afterwards at the end of Alboraya. The course, generally dry until here, begins to fill with water, coming up from diverse wells situated inside of the same stream. The last route of the ravine is totally filled with water and is a fishing area. On its right bank, near the mouth, there is another shrine that commemorates the miracle of the fish.

=== Canalisation ===
With a riverbed that is usually dry, strong periods of rain can be destructive, due to the size of its basin and its strong slopes. Remarkable floods occurred in 1949 and 1957. Furthermore, due to lack of water volume, there are a lot of garden paths between various towns of the region. These are unpractical and dangerous for crossing if the ravine contains some water.

== Tributaries ==
- l'Olla Ravine
- Pedralbilla Ravine
- Cirer Ravine (begins in the Calderona mountain chain)

== Green road ==
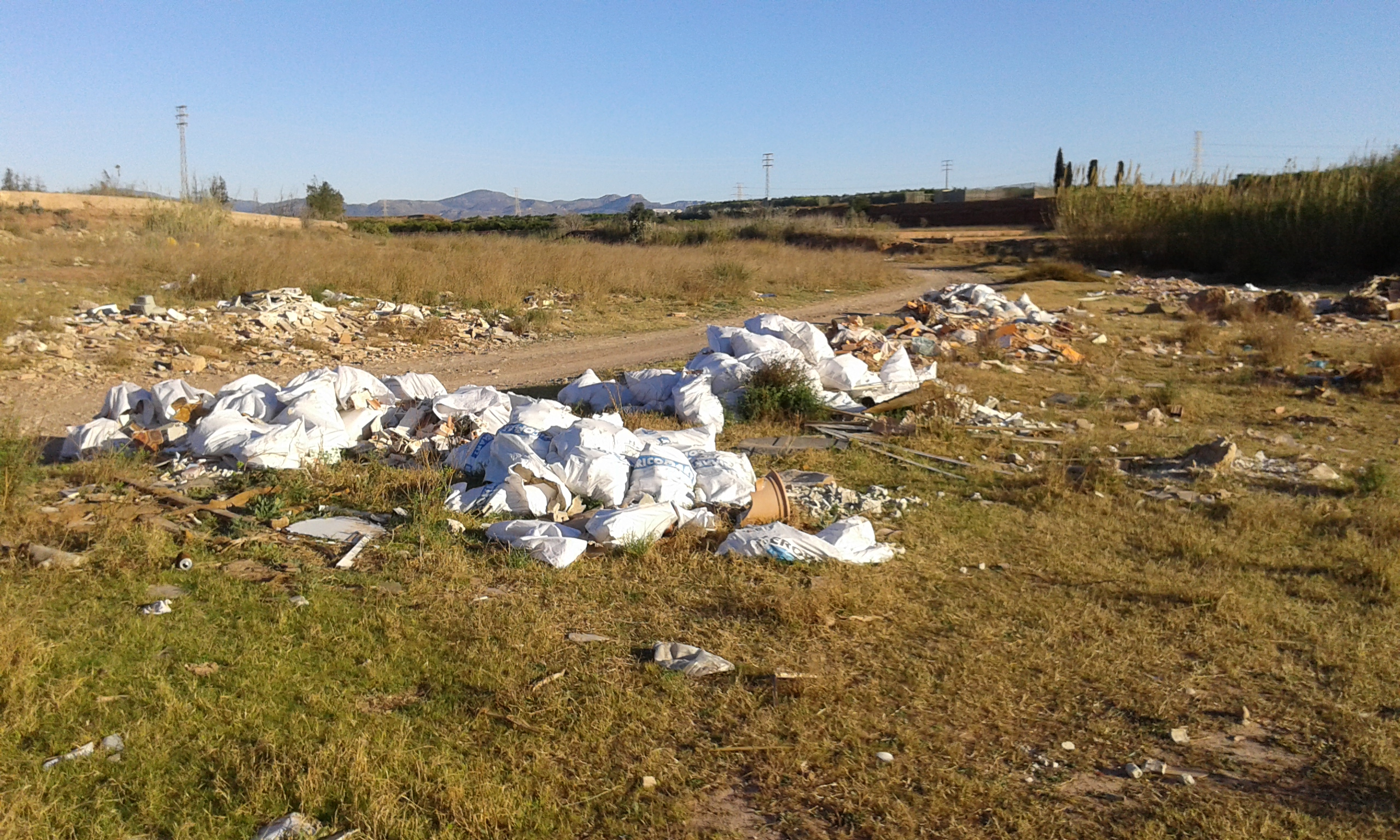

In September 2015, representatives from the Compromís collective, that is situated the banks of the Carraixet, met at Pont Sec ("dry bridge") to defend the ravine as a natural space, to begin to value its landscapes, and its biologic and hereditary values, and to report the aggressions that it is suffering from. The MP of Compromís, Joan Baldoví, presented an amendment of the general State budget, demanding an investment to adapt the riverside as a green road with shade, accessible zones, tourist indications and relaxing zones.

== Pont Sec ==
39°33′42.75″N 0°23′13.95″W

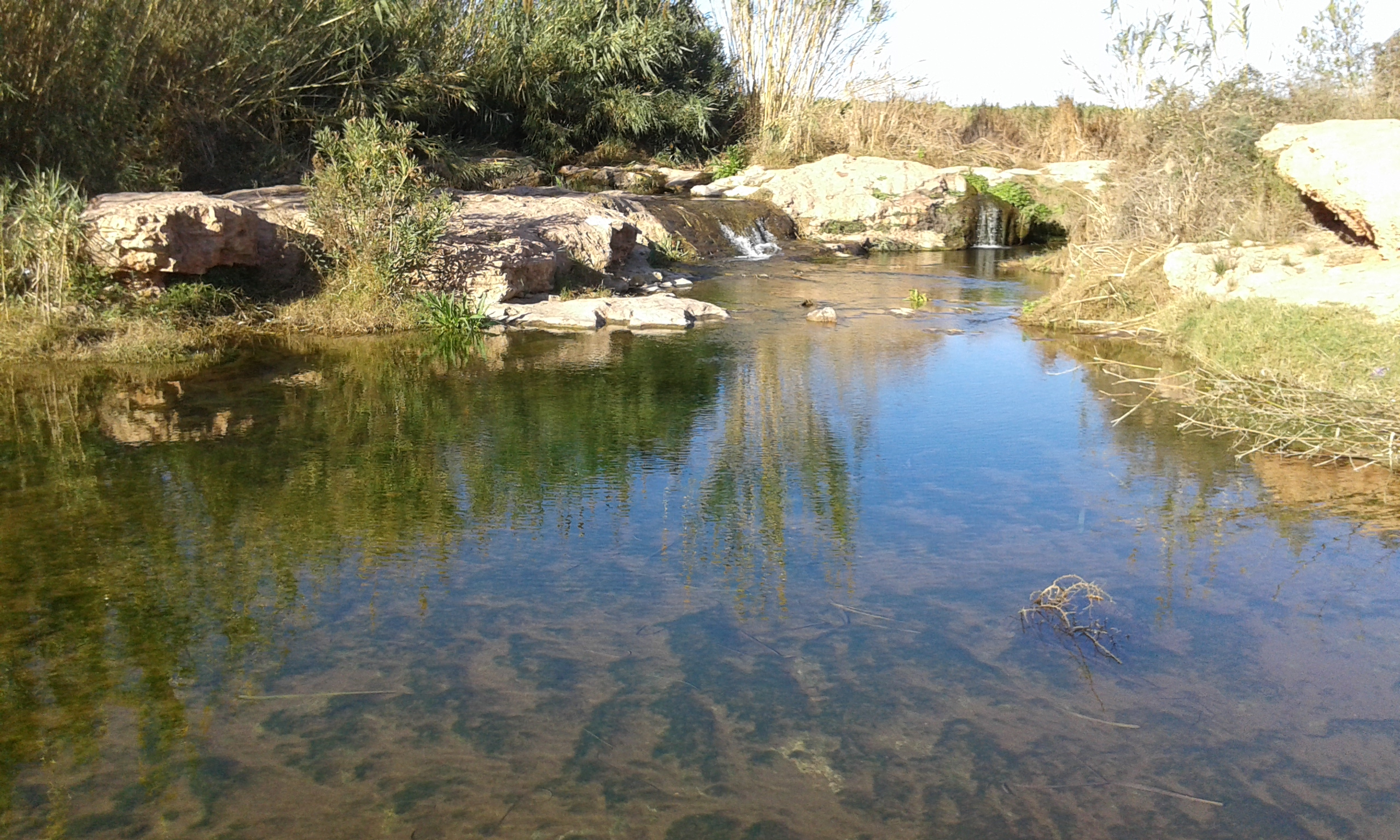

At the end of the Moncada municipality, the ravine is a road for livestock. Its environment has been damaged in the last years with dumps of rubbish, uncontrolled agricultural transformations, etc., and due to this, the aquatic plant ecosystem has disappeared almost entirely. Between the Pont Sec and the Racó de Casans (Metropolitan Seminar), between the municipal terms of Moncada and Foios, the Acequia of Bofilla has emerged, which provides water to keep the middle of the ravine in a humid zone, which is usually a dry zone. This facilitates the nesting of birds in the spring, and the possibility to see moorhens between the cattail bushes. It is also possible to see numerous vegetal species.

=== Environmental volunteering ===
Since 2013, volunteers from the Project Emys of Acció Environmentalist-Agró have started to monitor the population of Spanish pond turtles with traps made of nets, which are living in the Pont Sec. In this way, they are able to count the amount of the Mauremys leprosa.

In 2015, 24 volunteers participated in this initiative at Pont Sec, in collaboration with the Colla Ecologista of Massarrojos, Col·lectiu Cultural Bòbila from Alfara del Patriarca and the Associació Cultural Macarella from Bonrepòs i Mirambell. They were able to find five Iberian water turtles, three already captured and counted in previous editions, and two new turtles counted for the first time. They also removed a Pond slider, an exotic species that threatens the local turtles.

== Municipalities it passes by ==
- Gátova
- Marines
- Olocau
- Bétera
- Moncada
- Alfara del Patriarca
- Vinalesa
- Bonrepòs i Mirambell
- Tavernes Blanques
- Almàssera
- Alboraya
