= Alboraya =

Alboraya Alboraia
- Town and municipality
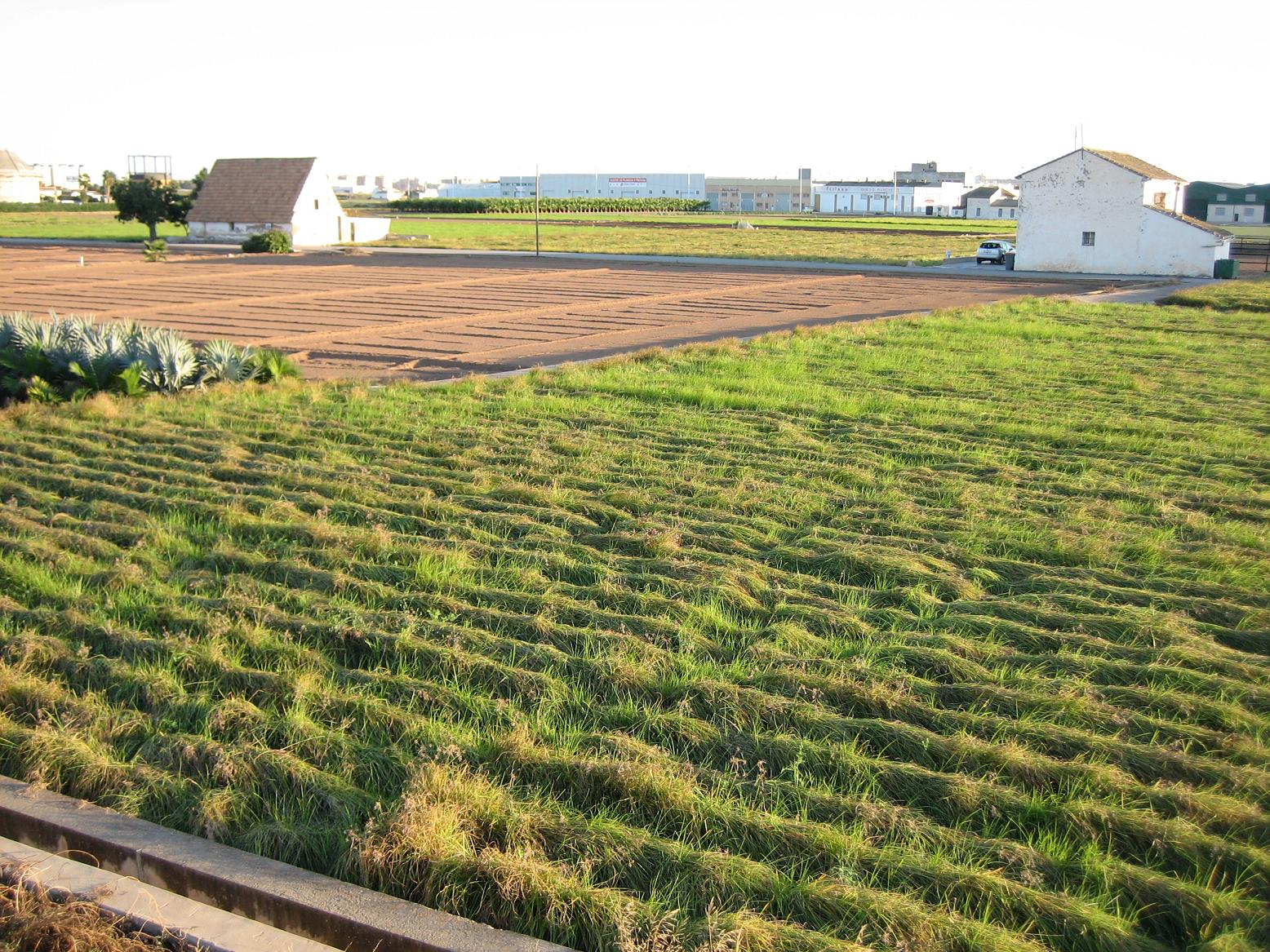
- Chufa cultivation fields in Alboraya

- Coat of arms

- Location within Province of Valencia Location within Valencian Community Location within Spain
- Coordinates: 39°30′0″N 0°21′8″W
- Country: Spain
- Autonomous community: Valencian Community
- Province: València / Valencia
- Comarca: Horta Nord
- Judicial district: Moncada

Government
  - Alcalde (Mayor): Miguel Chavarria (PSOE)

Area
  - Total: 8.3 km^{2} (3.2 sq mi)
- Elevation: 5 m (16 ft)

Population (2025-01-01)
  - Total: 26,273
  - Density: 3,200/km^{2} (8,200/sq mi)
- Demonyms: Alborayan • alboraier, -a (Val.) • alborayense (Sp.)
- Official language(s): Valencian; Spanish
- Linguistic area: Valencian
- Time zone: UTC+1 (CET)
  - Summer (DST): UTC+2 (CEST)
- Postal code: 46120
- Website: Official website

Alboraya, (Note: Pronunciation of Alboraya: Spanish: [alβoˈɾaʝa]) in Spanish, spelled Alboraia (Note: Pronunciation of Alboraia: Valencian: [alboˈɾaja]) in Valencian, is a town and municipality of the province of Valencia, Spain. It is situated very close to the city of Valencia.

Originally a farming community, Alboraya has grown in recent decades following the development of the metropolitan area of Valencia. Better transport connections, including two stations on the Valencia metro system (Alboraya-Palmaret and Alboraya-Peris Aragó). The population increased from 11,267 in 1986, to an estimated 24,741 in 2020. Of these, 58.84% declared themselves to be Valencian speakers.

In 1994, 45.8% worked in the service sector, 33% in industry, 16.7% in agriculture, and 3.60% in construction.

In the May 2011 elections, the People's Party (PP) lost their absolute majority, as they fell from 11 to 8 council seats. The remaining seats were won by the Spanish Socialist Workers' Party (PSOE) (5), Unión Popular de Alboraya (3), Coalició Compromís (3) and Ciudadanos por Alboraya (Citizens for Alboraya) (2). Subsequently, a coalition of everyone but the PP was formed, with Miguel Chavarria becoming the first PSOE Mayor since 1999.

Traditional crops are based on irrigated, intensive farming. Especially important are the tiger nuts (Spanish: chufas, Valencian: xufes), which are used to produce horchata (Valencian: orxata), a popular refreshment.

== Geography ==
The town still contains large, open, irrigated fields which are farmed intensively but these areas are shrinking due to urban pressure. The designation of the city of Valencia as host city for the 2007 America's Cup sparked major land development. Seventy-five percent of the competing teams located their bases of operation in Alboraya.

The municipality is divided into eight parts: Calvet, Desamparados, Mar, Masamardá, Masquefa, Miracle, Savoy and Vera.

Alboraya is connected to the rest of the Valencian metropolitan area by line 3 of the Valencia Metro with two stations, Alboraya and Palmaret, line 70 of the Municipal Transport Company of Valencia, EMT, and Patacona provides buses on line 31 of the EMT bus company.

The council offers the people a local bus service, which runs through the villages of Alboraya, linking the village with Port Saplaya and Patacona seven days a week, with a frequency of one bus every hour.

=== Neighbouring towns ===
Alboraya is bordered by Almàssera to the northwest, Meliana to the north, Tavernes Blanques to the west, Valencia city to the south and the Mediterranean Sea to the east; all in the province of Valencia.

== History ==
King James I of Aragon gave land to the bishop of Huesca, Vidal de Canellas. Teresa Gil de Vidaure, the king's third wife, managed the property through a land swap with the bishop which strengthened the patrimony of their son James of Jérica. In 1331, it passed into the hands of Gilberto Zanoguera, who founded the lordship of Alboraya. During the 15th century, it was held by the Crown.

The church was built in the 15th century and dedicated to Santa Maria. Along the Carraixet ravine a chapel was constructed dedicated to Our Lady of Desamparados (the Virgin of the Helpless), its first building dates from 1414 and was ordered built by the General Council of Valencia the year 1400. It included a consecrated cemetery where the executed and disadvantaged were buried. The current building is new.

The main activity is agriculture, and the most important crop is the plug, which has become popular in the Alboraya horchata.

The year 1646 population census provides a calculation of 88 houses; Cavanilles population figure in the year 1794 of 560, in the mid-19th century 3301, and in 1922, there were 4265 inhabitants.

== Demography ==
The population of Alboraya has experienced significant growth over the last few decades. In 1986, the municipality had 11,267 inhabitants; by 2002, this figure had risen to 18,656. According to the 2001 census, 58.84% of the population reported having some level of proficiency in the Valencian language.

As of 1 January 2025, the population reached 26,273 inhabitants.

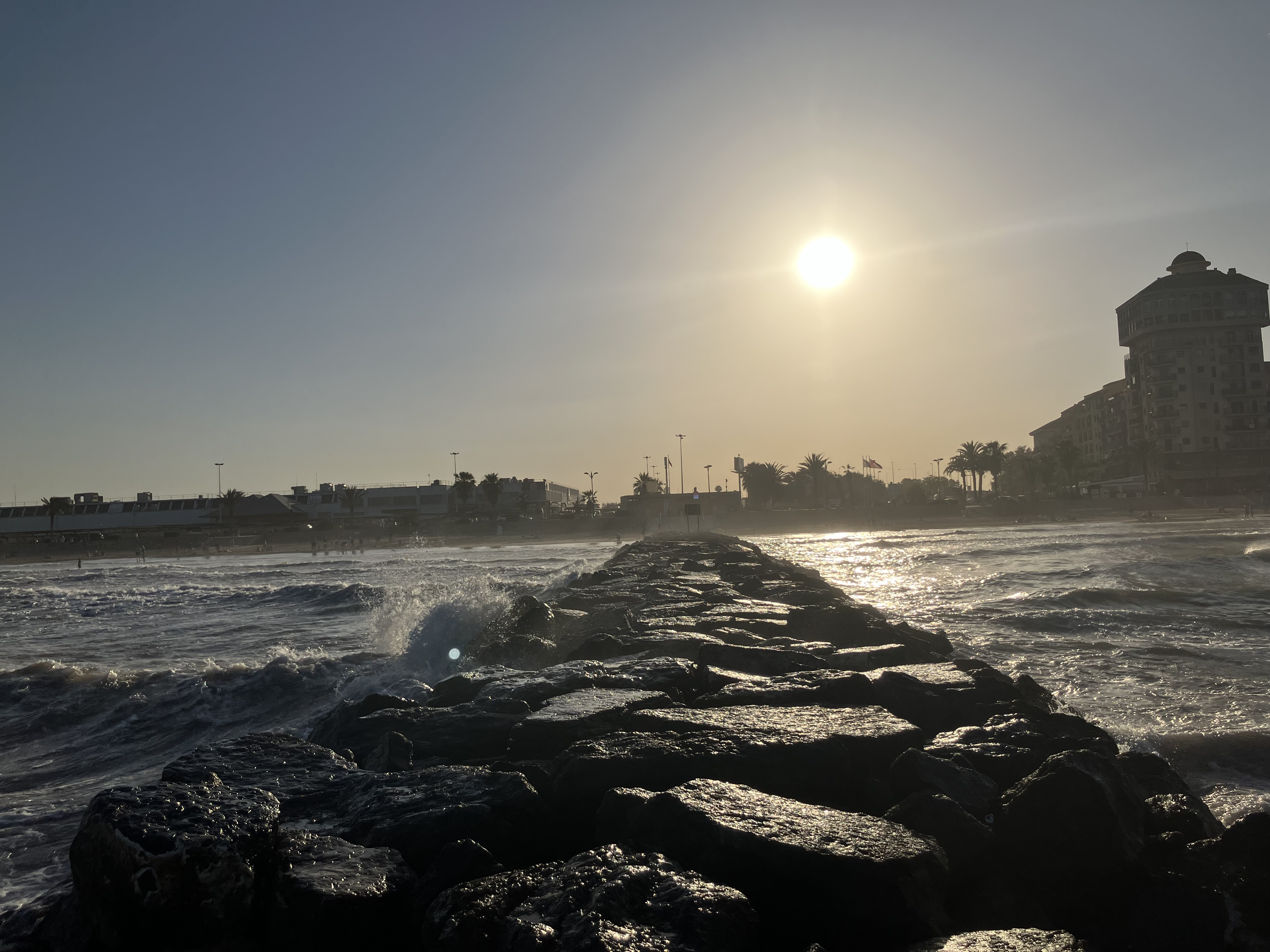
The skyline of Alboraya as seen from the beach of Port Saplaya.

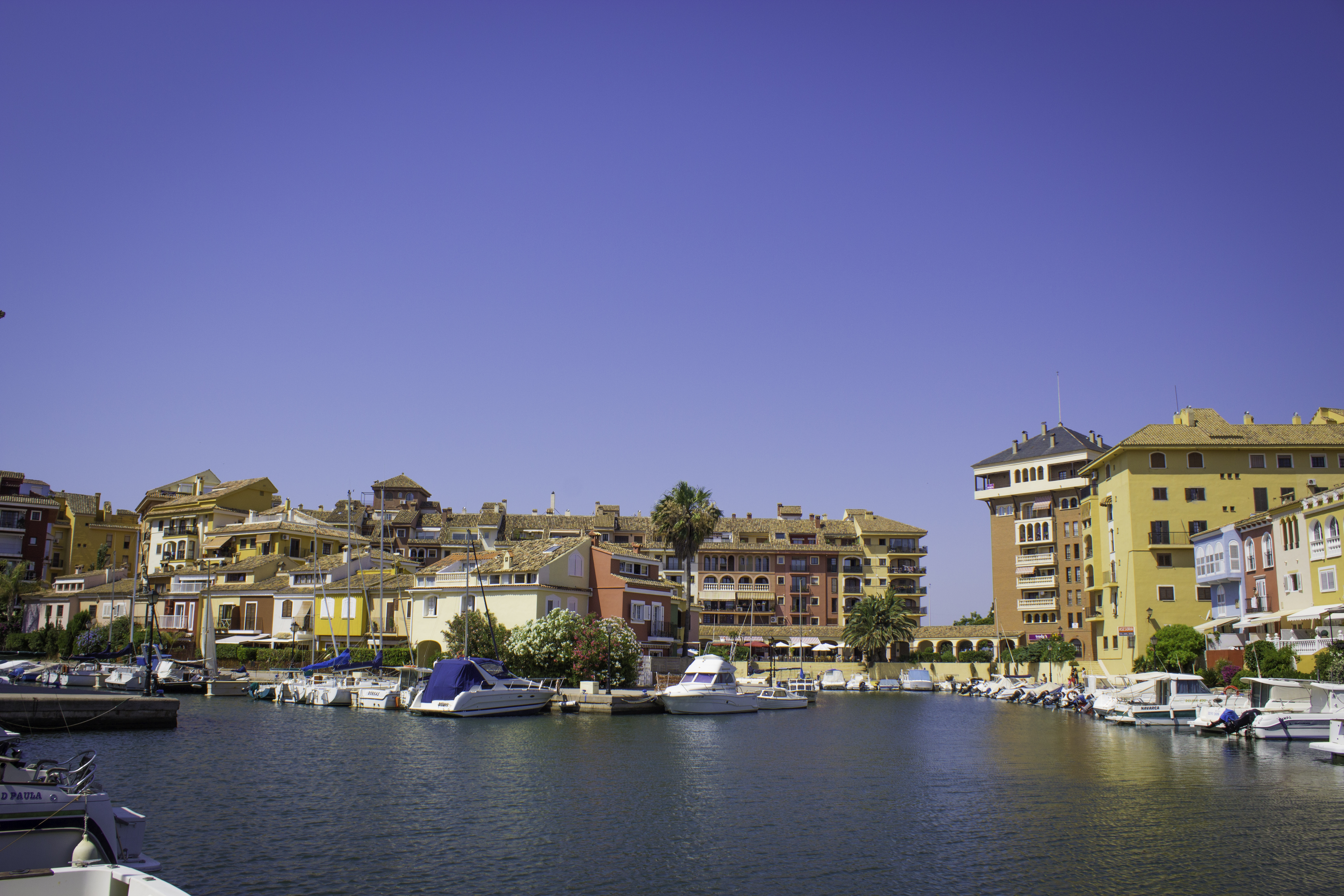
Port Saplaya, the port of Alboraya

Demographic trends
1900	1910	1920	1930	1940	1950	1960	1970	1981	1991	2001	2005	2008	2011	2020
4,700	4,807	5,712	6,124	6,749	6,885	8,073	9,126	10,786	11,697	18,201	20,514	22,174	22,915	24,741

== Economy ==
Economic activity in the population is distributed as follows (1994 data): 45.80% work in the service sector, 33% in industry, 16.70% in agriculture, and finally, 3.60% in construction.

== Culture ==
=== Arts and architecture ===
Alboraya still retains the flavour typical of people in an important part of the town. The coastline is nearly four miles long, with two residential neighborhoods separated by the mouth of the Barranco del Carraixet: Port Saplaya and Patacona. The first has a marina that offers the possibility of having mooring a boat at ones front door. It is a residential complex and walk characterized by the warm ochres, blue and pale pink, traditionally used in the painting of houses. The second has housing in the space occupied by a former paper mill. Both areas have excellent beaches.

Some of its monuments include The Parish Church of Our Lady of the Assumption (18th century) with the home abbey formed in a block. The people of Alboraya have other shrines such as the Chapel of the Holy Christ of Souls in Mas Vilanova, the shrine of the Sacred Heart of Jesus and the house of the Rector, the Hermitage of Santa Barbara (recently restored ) in the neighborhood of the same name, the Chapel of San Cristobal near the industrial estate, and at the mouth of the Barranco del Carraixet the Chapel of the Peixets (Miracle of the fish). All of them are part of an important historical and artistic heritage, rich in sculptures, paintings, retables, and pottery.

=== Cuisine ===
Alboraya's foods include typical valencian dishes like a pot made with rice, beans and turnips (arròs amb fesols i naps); baked rice (arròs al forn); rice with spinach; ox-liver paella (paella amb fetge); spicy snails (avellanencs). Local desserts include the fartons and the so-called "Christian cake" (coca escudellà).

== See also ==
- List of municipalities in Valencia
