= Alfara del Patriarca =

- Municipality
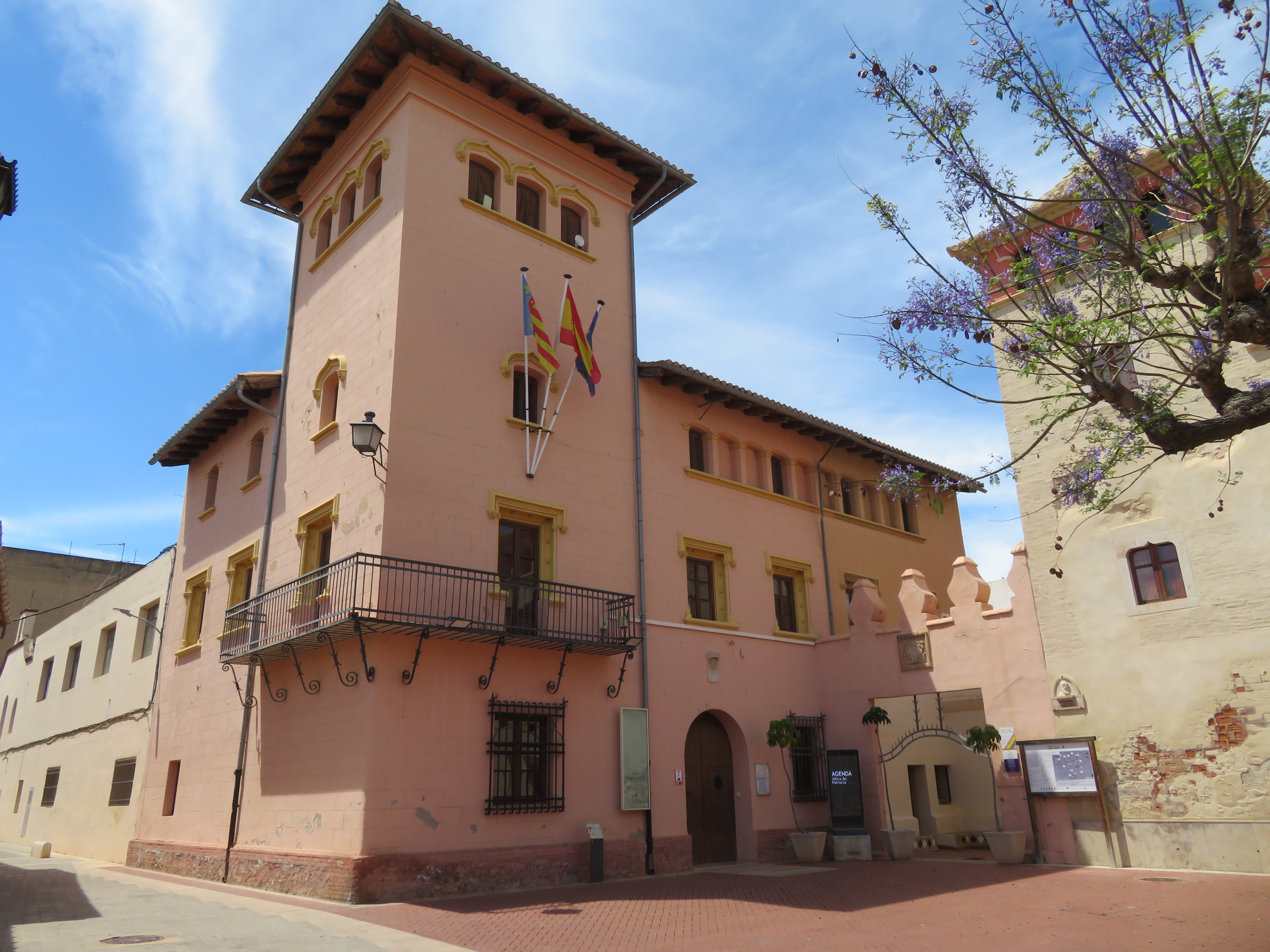
- Town hall

- Coat of arms

- Location in Spain
- Coordinates: 39°32′37″N 0°23′6″W
- Country: Spain
- Autonomous community: Valencian Community
- Province: Valencia
- Comarca: Horta Nord
- Judicial district: Moncada

Government
  - Alcalde: Enric Miquel Cuñat Sese (2007) (PSOE)

Area
  - Total: 1.98 km^{2} (0.76 sq mi)
- Elevation: 35 m (115 ft)

Population (2025-01-01)
  - Total: 3,740
  - Density: 1,890/km^{2} (4,890/sq mi)
- Demonym: Alfarero/-a
- Time zone: UTC+1 (CET)
  - Summer (DST): UTC+2 (CEST)
- Postal code: 46115
- Official language(s): Valencia
- Website: Official website

Alfara del Patriarca is a municipality in the comarca of Horta Nord in the Valencian Community, Spain.

== Geography ==
The municipal area of 2 km^{2} is located in the Horta of Valencia. The natural disaster are rare because the land is almost flat, the urban area is located at an altitude of 35 m. The only exception is the Carraixet ravine that crosses the municipal area from north to south at a short distance from the urban area. Although it is normally dry, the large basin causes frequent overflows during the periods of cold drop in autumn. The municipal area is crossed by the Acequia Real de Moncada.

== Bordering towns ==
Foios, Moncada, Vinalesa and the Valencian districts of Carpesa and Benifaraig.

== History ==
Like most towns in the Alfara del Patriarca region, it was a Muslim farmhouse. It was conquered by Jaime I in 1249 who later gave it to Ximén Pérez from the Aragonese town of Tarazona. Later it was transferred to Guillén Jáfer and Bonifacio Ferrer who made it a manor.

== Notable citizens ==
- Manuel Palau: composer; two times Spanish National Award of Music (1927 and 1949)
- José Martínez Valero: boxerl European Champion; alias The Tiger of Alfara

== See also ==
- List of municipalities in Valencia
