= Lladró =

Spanish company based in Tavernes Blanques, Valencia

Lladró Comercial SA
- Type: S.A. (corporation)
- Founded: 1953
- Headquarters: Tavernes Blanques, Spain
- Products: Porcelain art and figurines
- Website: www.lladro.com

Lladró (Valencian pronunciation: [ʎaˈðɾo]) is a Spanish company based in Tavernes Blanques, Valencia, that produces high-end lighting, home accessories, decorative sculptures and porcelain figurines.

== History ==
The company was founded in 1953 by three brothers, Juán, José and Vicente Lladró, in the village of Almàssera near Valencia. Starting with items such as vases and jugs, it wasn't until 1956 that they started producing the sculptures for which they are now known. Interest in the items produced by the Lladró brothers saw their small workshop expand several times until eventually they moved to Tavernes Blanques in 1958.

- 1962, the brothers open the Professional Training School at their site in Tavernes Blanques to share their knowledge and experience.
- 1969, on 13 October the City of Porcelain was opened by the Spanish Minister for Industry. It took two years to build and employs over 2,000 people.

A set of Lladró figurines

- 1970, Lladró begins to use earthenware for some of its sculptures. It has earthy colours and is used frequently in natural themes.
- 1973, Lladró buys 50 percent of the North American company Weil Ceramics & Glass.
- 1974, the first blue Lladró emblem, consisting of a bellflower and ancient chemical symbol, appears on the base to show the origin of the sculpture. The Elite Collection is also launched.
- 1984, Rosa, Mari Carmen and Juan Vicente Lladró joined the company. Each is a child of each of the founding brothers. They underwent a long apprenticeship before they were permitted responsibility in the company.
- 1985, the Collectors’ Society is formed. The first annual sculpture, "Little Pals", can fetch several thousand US dollars at auction due to the small number of members able to purchase it in the early years.
- 1986, Lladró forms an alliance with the Mitsui Group creating the subsidiary Bussan Lladró based in Tokyo.
- 1988, on 18 September in New York City the Lladró Museum and Gallery is opened on 57th Street in Manhattan.
- 1993, Lladró receives the Principe Felipe award for internationalisation.
- 2001, Lladró Privilege, a new customer loyalty programme, takes over from the Lladró Collectors’ Society.
- 2004, Lladró Privilege Gold, becomes a new level of loyalty programme within the Privilege programme.
- 2011, Lladró Privilege Society becomes Lladró Gold, in which only one level of membership is offered.
- 2013, Lladró expands into the lighting market with Belle De Nuit, a collection of chandeliers, lamps and sconces.
- 2013, Lladró releases the first piece in their new Dazzle collection which uses a geometric black and white design.
- 2016, PHI Industrial Acquisitions acquires a majority stake in the Lladró Group.
- 2020, the U.S. division of Lladró Group files for Chapter 11 bankruptcy.

== Technique ==
Lladró figurine called "En sus pensamientos"

The manufacturing ingredients are kept closely guarded. The process is detailed in a number of Lladró publications and is on view for tours at the City of Porcelain. Lladró figurines are made of hard-paste porcelain.

Classic Lladro Guitar Girl figurine.

== Marketing ==
Lladró figurines are given an additional title in English as well as the Spanish original, however these names are frequently not translations (figurative or literal) but new names that are more likely to appeal to an English speaking audience. An area for some confusion is that the names of the pieces can change throughout their run so the same figurine may end up with several titles.

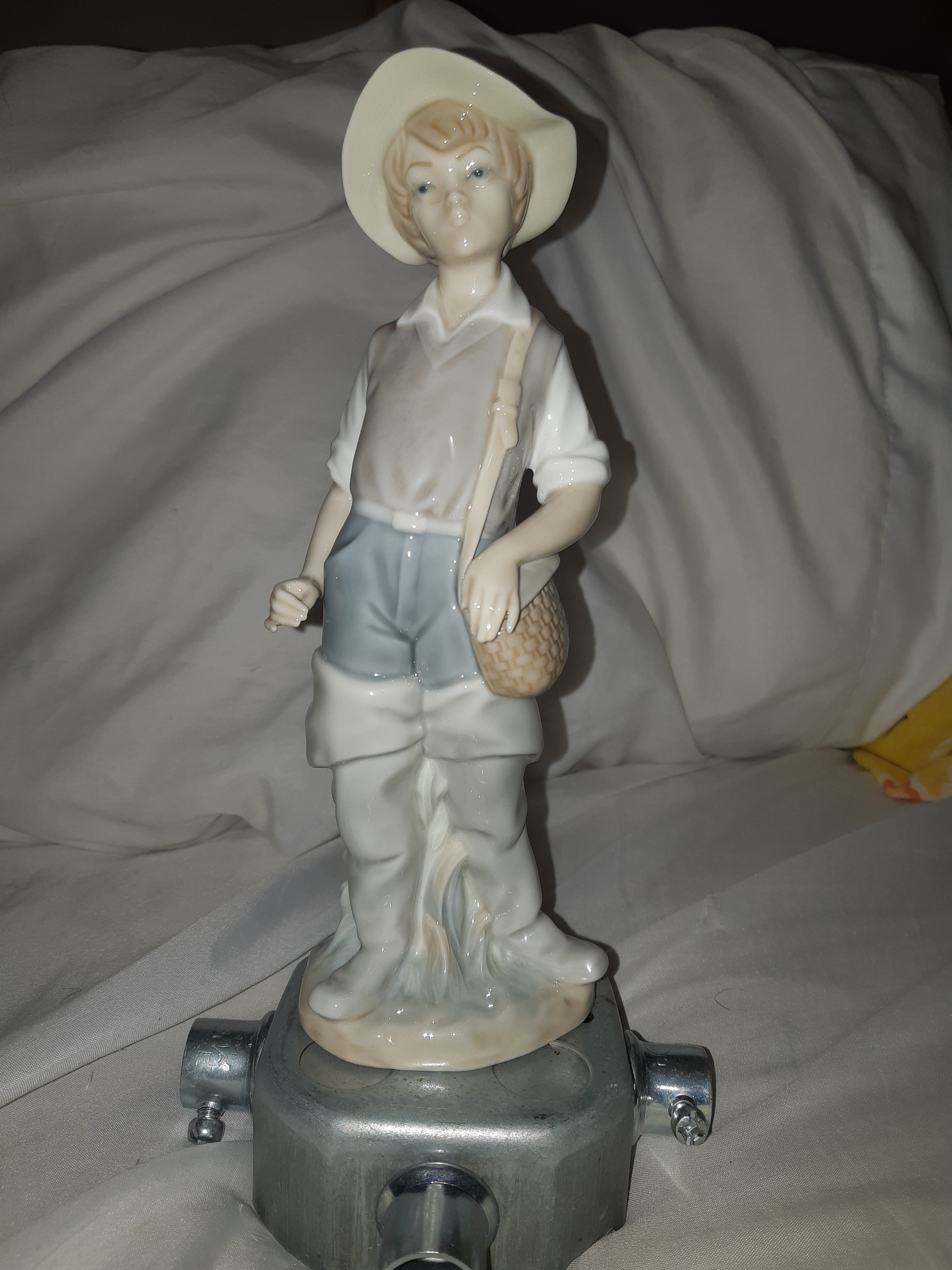
A Lladro figurine of a fisher boy. (Ref 4809)

== See also ==
- Porcelain manufacturing companies in Europe
