= Castillo de Albalat dels Sorells =

- Palacio de los Sorells
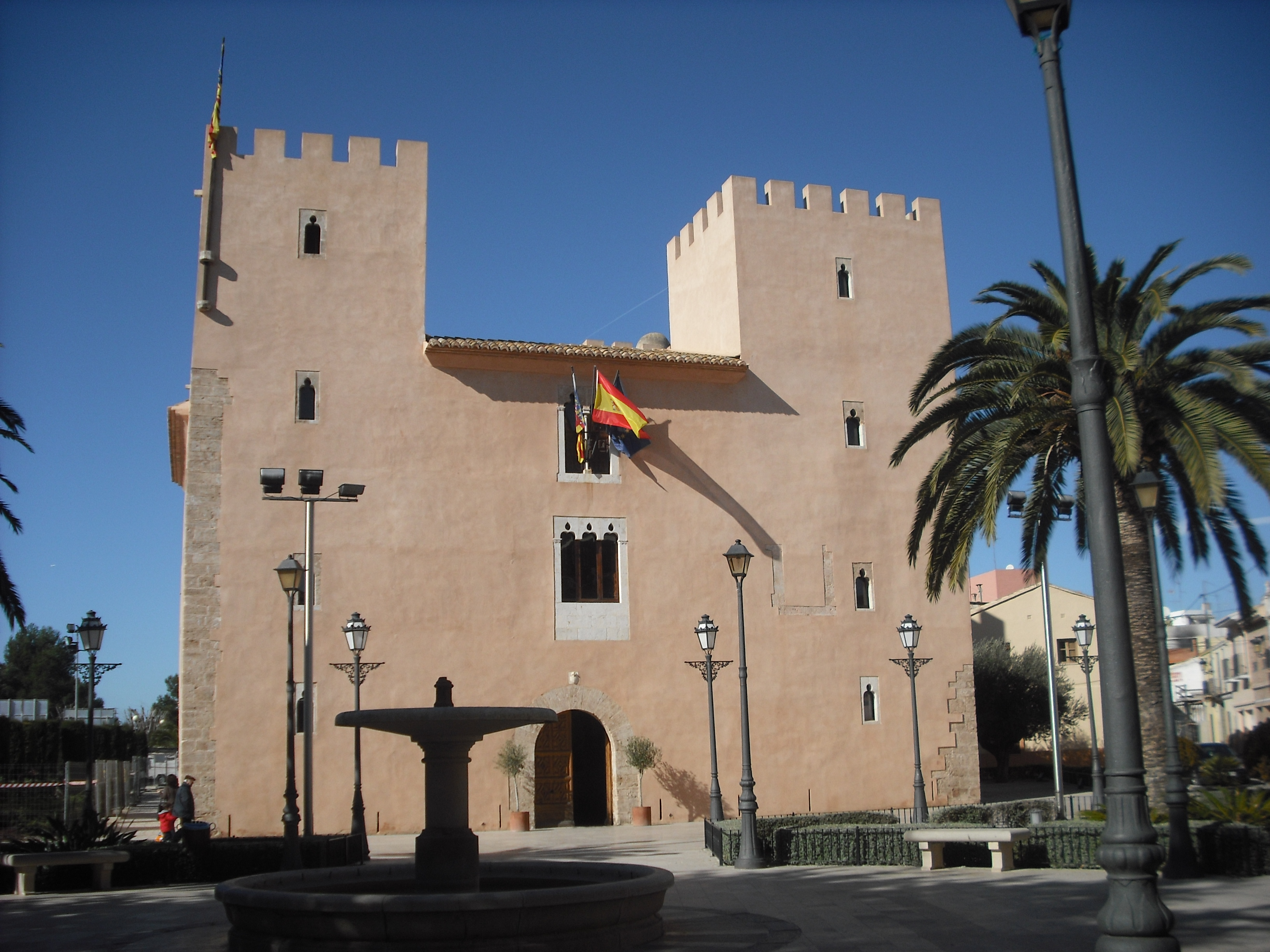
- East facade of the castle
- Interactive map of the Castillo de Albalat dels Sorells area

General information
- Type: Castle
- Architectural style: Gothic
- Location: Spain Albalat dels Sorells, Valencia, Spain, C/ Castillo, 19 y 20
- Construction started: 15th century
- Completed: ongoing

Height
- Height: 13 m (18 m in the towers)

Design and construction
- Designations: Bien de Interés Cultural (1985)

The Castillo de Albalat dels Sorells is a medieval fortified manor palace located in Albalat dels Sorells, in the province of Valencia, Spain. It has been protected as a Bien de Interés Cultural (Asset of Cultural Interest) since 1985.

== History ==
Records indicate that a residence already existed on the site during the 14th century, when Berenguer de Codinats, Master Rational of the Crown, acquired the farmstead of Albalat and renamed it Albalat de Codinats. However, the decorative elements suggest the main construction took place in the advanced 15th century, when Tomás Sorells Segarriga purchased the lordship of Albalat. The building has undergone numerous modifications and restorations over the centuries, resulting in a complex mixture of architectural styles that makes it difficult to identify its original form.

Around 1900, the historian Teodoro Llorente described it as follows:

The manor castle of Albalat is today a rustic farmhouse: the old cambras, perhaps once the scene of splendid banquets, now store field produce; thick layers of lime have covered the fine stonework on the walls; the Gothic windows are embedded within them, and only the courtyard retains its artistic character, with its wide stone staircase, its gallery of slender columns and pointed arches, and a twin window with a double arch divided by a delicate pilaster.

— Teodoro Llorente, Valencia.

== Description ==
The castle is a fortified rural noble residence from the Middle Ages. It has a rectangular floor plan with four corner towers and a central courtyard, around which four bays are arranged, containing various halls and rooms. The building was originally surrounded by an extensive orchard, except on the side facing the town square. Notable features include the gallery and stone staircase, which rests on a finely crafted arch in the central courtyard, as well as the semicircular arch doorway on the main facade, built with large stone voussoirs. The Gothic windows are also of interest, although many are not original. The ceilings are simple, in keeping with the Valencian Gothic tradition. The roof slopes outward and is built with Moorish-style tiles.

The building measures 22 m per side and 13 m in height, rising to 18 m at the towers. Together with the Alaquàs Castle, it is considered the most important manor building in the Horta de València comarca and the Valencia metropolitan area. It is in good condition thanks to recent restoration works carried out to adapt it to house the municipal offices.
