= Emperador, Spain =

Emperador
- Municipality
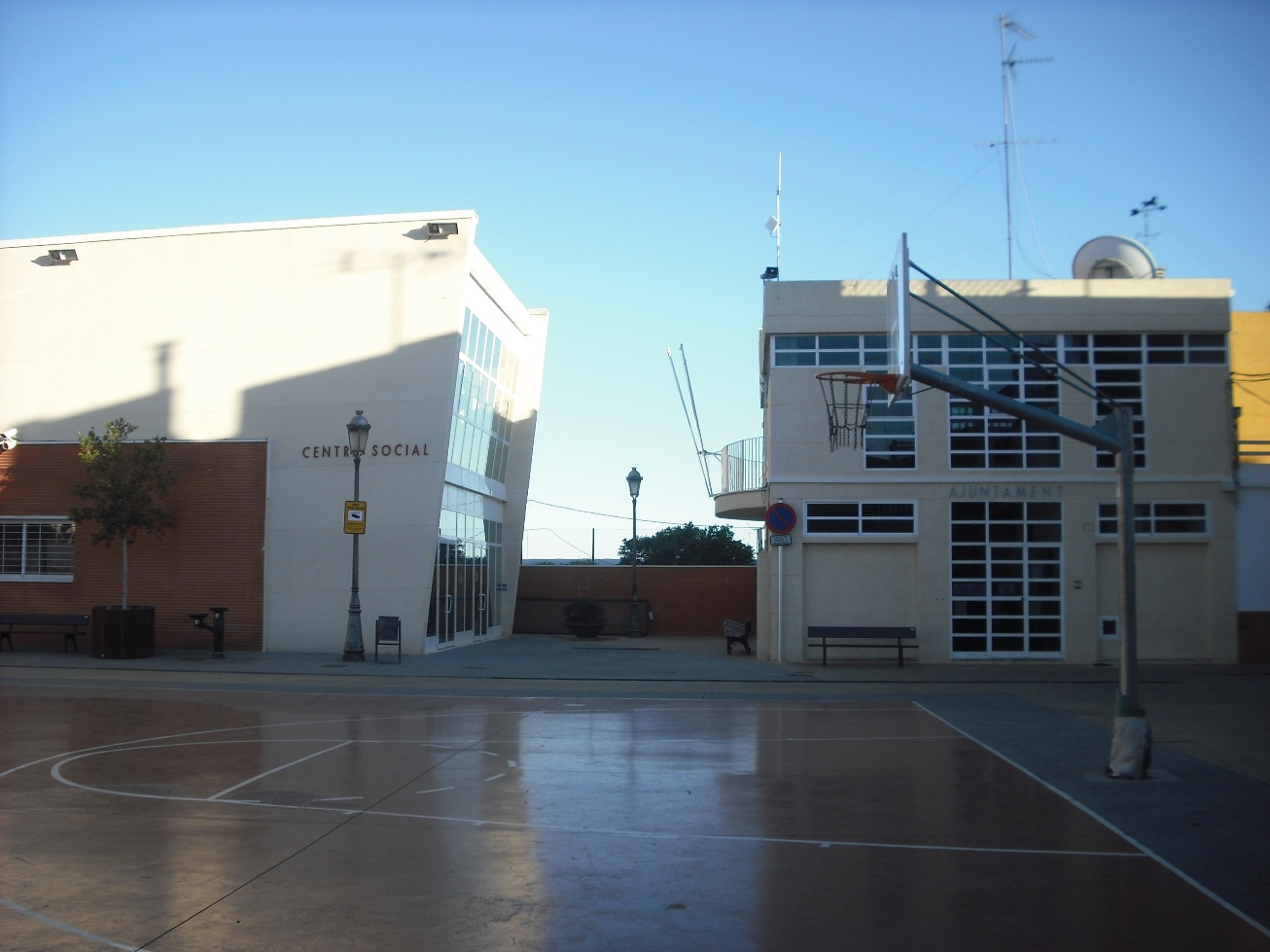

- Coat of arms
- Interactive map of Emperador
- Coordinates: 39°33′24″N 0°20′26″W
- Country: Spain
- Autonomous community: Valencian Community
- Province: Valencia
- Comarca: Horta Nord
- Judicial district: Montcada

Government
  - Alcalde (2023): Alberto Bayarri Remolí (PP)

Area
  - Total: 0.028 km^{2} (0.011 sq mi)

Population (2025-01-01)
  - Total: 700
  - Density: 25,000/km^{2} (65,000/sq mi)
- Demonym(s): Venter, ventera
- Time zone: UTC+1 (CET)
- Postal code: 46135
- Official language(s): Valencian
- Website: Official website

Emperador is a municipality in the comarca of Horta Nord in the Valencian Community, Spain. It is the second smallest municipality in all Spain, covering just 0.028 km^{2} (0.011 sq mi). It had 700 inhabitants as of 2025. In Valencian it is called "Emperador" or "Venta de l'Emperador" or just "la Venta".

== See also ==
- List of municipalities in Valencia
