= Horta Nord =

Horta Nord Huerta Norte
- Comarca
- Coordinates: 39°33′14″N 0°20′35″W
- Country: Spain
- Autonomous community: Valencian Community
- Province: València / Valencia
- Capital: Puçol
- Municipalities: 22 municipalities: Albalat dels Sorells, Alboraya, Albuixech, Alfara del Patriarca, Almàssera, Bonrepòs i Mirambell, Burjassot, Emperador, Foios, Godella, Massalfassar, Massamagrell, Meliana, Moncada, Museros, La Pobla de Farnals, Puçol, El Puig, Rafelbunyol, Rocafort, Tavernes Blanques, Vinalesa

Area
  - Total: 166.19 km^{2} (64.17 sq mi)

Population (2006)
  - Total: 206,034
  - Density: 1,239.7/km^{2} (3,210.9/sq mi)
- Time zone: UTC+1 (CET)
  - Summer (DST): UTC+2 (CEST)
- Most populated municipality: Burjassot

Horta Nord (Valencian: [ˈɔɾta ˈnɔɾt], also [ˈɔɾtɔ ˈnɔɾt]; Spanish: Huerta Norte [ˈweɾta ˈnoɾte]) is a comarca in the province of Valencia, Valencian Community, Spain.

== Municipalities ==
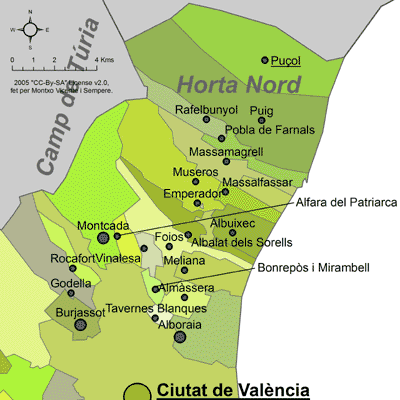
Municipalities of Horta Nord

- Albalat dels Sorells
- Alboraya (Alboraia)
- Albuixech (Albuixec)
- Alfara del Patriarca
- Almàssera
- Bonrepòs i Mirambell
- Burjassot
- Emperador
- Foios
- Godella
- Massalfassar
- Massamagrell
- Meliana
- Moncada
- Museros
- La Pobla de Farnals
- Puçol
- El Puig (El Puig de Santa Maria)
- Rafelbunyol
- Rocafort
- Tavernes Blanques
- Vinalesa
