= Museros =

- Municipality
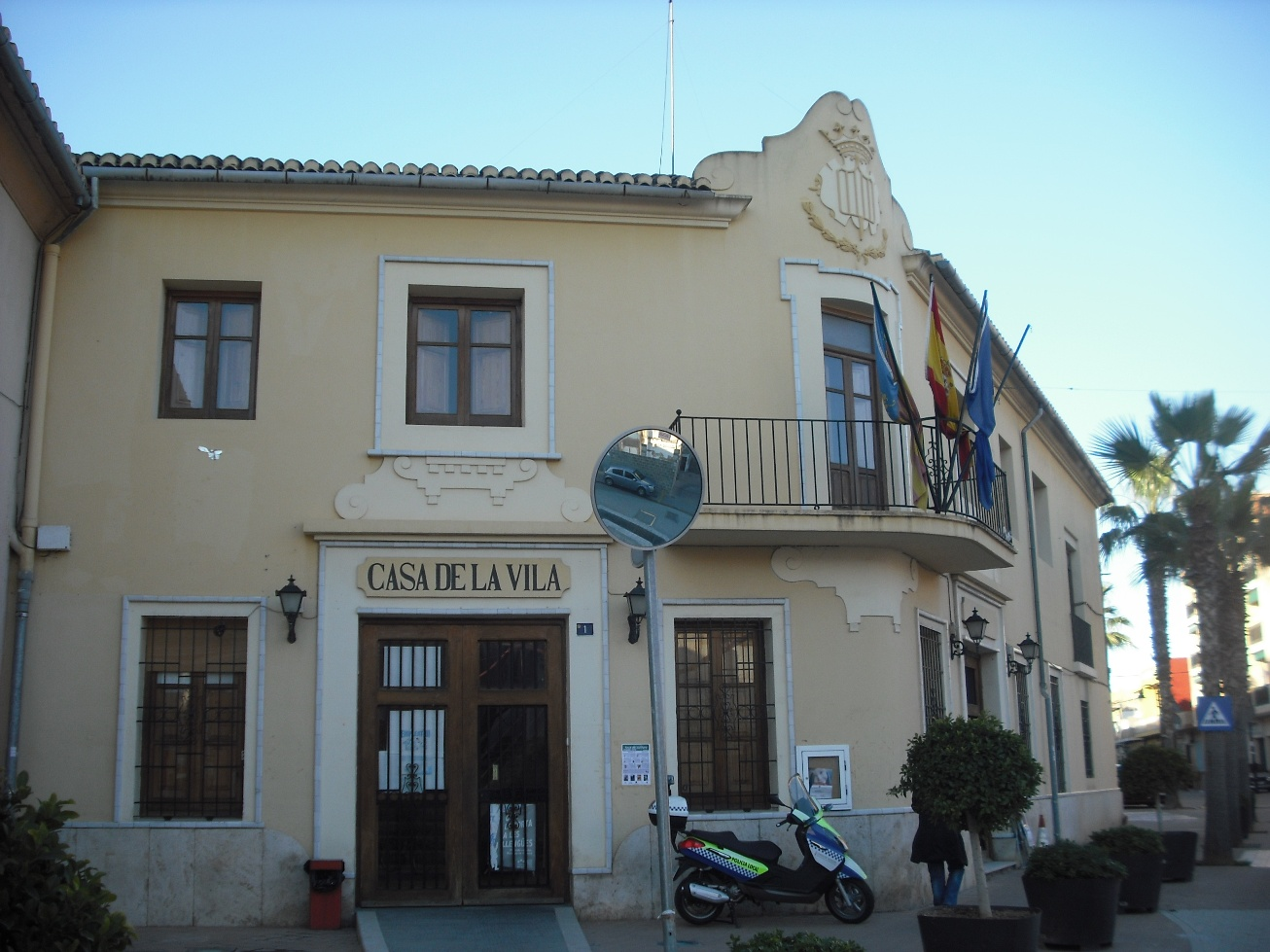
- The Town Hall of Museros

- Coat of arms

- Location in Spain
- Coordinates: 39°33′57″N 0°20′28″W
- Country: Spain
- Autonomous community: Valencian Community
- Province: Valencia
- Comarca: Horta Nord
- Judicial district: Massamagrell

Government
  - Alcalde: José María Aznar Monferrer

Area
  - Total: 12.4 km^{2} (4.8 sq mi)
- Elevation: 12 m (39 ft)

Population (2025-01-01)
  - Total: 6,871
  - Density: 554/km^{2} (1,440/sq mi)
- Demonym: Muserenco
- Time zone: UTC+1 (CET)
  - Summer (DST): UTC+2 (CEST)
- Postal code: 46136
- Official language(s): Valencian
- Website: Official website

Museros is a municipality in the comarca of Horta Nord in the Valencian Community, Spain.

== See also ==
- List of municipalities in Valencia
