= Albuixech =

Albuixech Albuixec
- Municipality
- Coat of arms

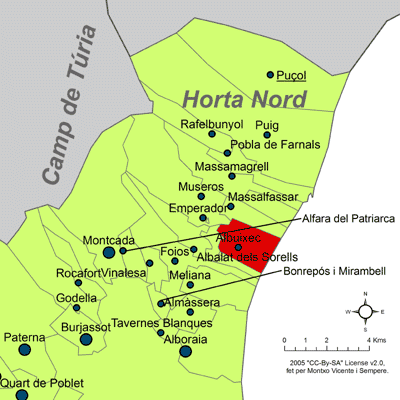
- Location in Horta Nord comarca

- Location in Spain
- Coordinates: 39°32′37″N 0°19′18″W
- Country: Spain
- Autonomous community: Valencian Community
- Province: Valencia
- Comarca: Horta Nord
- Judicial district: Massamagrell

Government
  - Alcalde: José Vicente Andreu Castelló

Area
  - Total: 4.4 km^{2} (1.7 sq mi)
- Elevation: 3 m (9.8 ft)

Population (2025-01-01)
  - Total: 4,482
  - Density: 1,000/km^{2} (2,600/sq mi)
- Demonym: Albuixequí/-ina
- Time zone: UTC+1 (CET)
  - Summer (DST): UTC+2 (CEST)
- Postal code: 46550
- Official language(s): Valencian

Albuixech (Valencian: [albujˈʃek], modern Valencian spelling: Albuixec; Spanish: Albuixech [alβwiˈsek]) is a municipality in the comarca of Horta Nord in the Valencian Community, Spain.

== See also ==
- List of municipalities in Valencia
