= Godella =

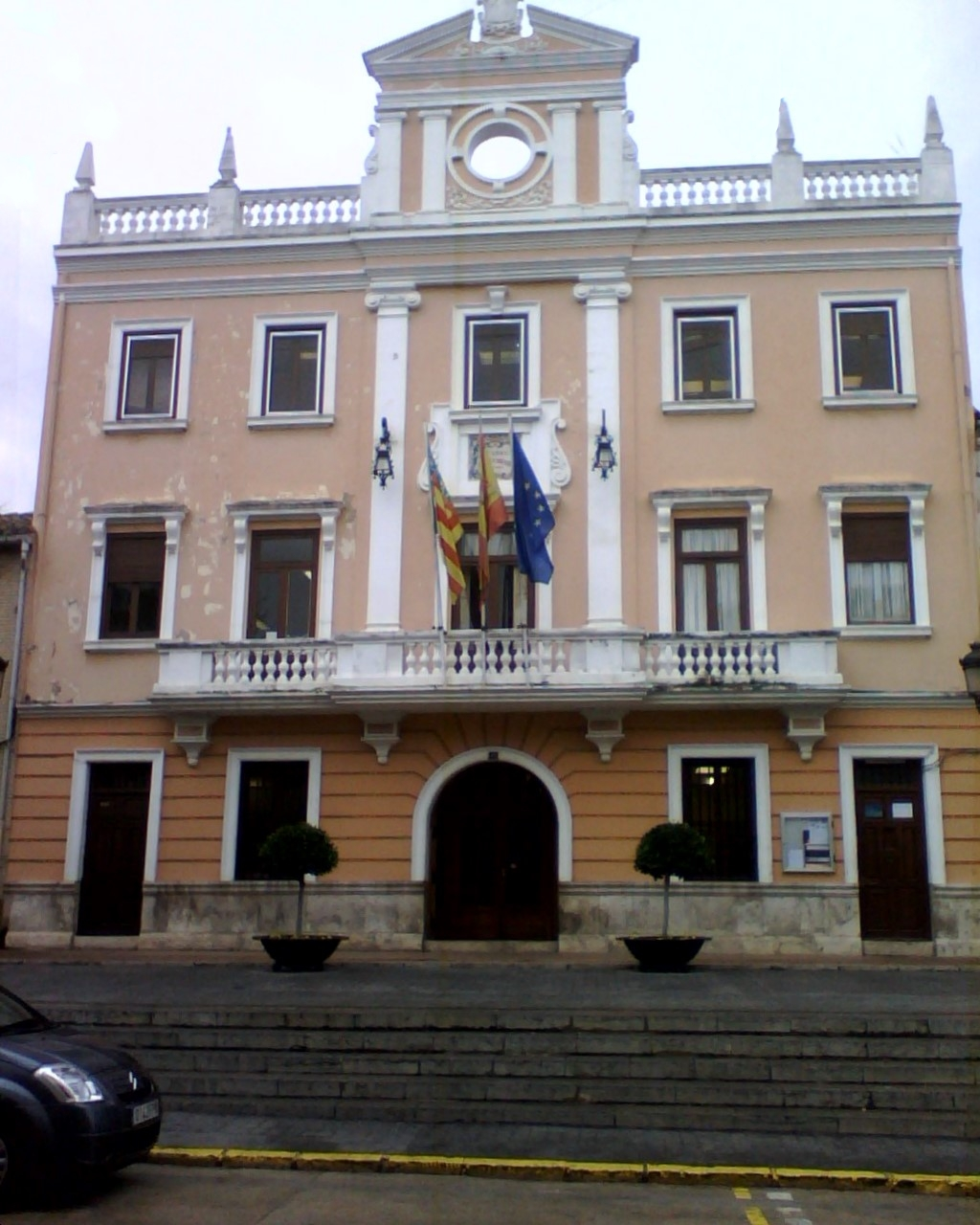
- Town hall

- Seal

- Location in Spain
- Coordinates: 39°31′12″N 0°24′41″W
- Country: Spain
- Autonomous community: Community of Valencia
- Province: Valencia
- Comarca: Horta Nord
- Settled: 1238

Government
  - Mayor: Eva Sanchis i Bargues

Area
  - Total: 8.30 km^{2} (3.20 sq mi)
- Elevation: 30 m (98 ft)

Population (2023)
  - Total: 13,414
  - Density: 1,620/km^{2} (4,190/sq mi)
  - Language: Valencian
- Demonym: Godellers
- Postal code: 46110
- Website: Official website

Godella is a municipality in the comarca of Horta Nord, province of Valencia, Spain.

Godella was founded in 1238 by the cession of James I of Aragon of a region named Godayla to the Aragonese Pedro Maza.

Although part of the municipal area is cultivated (producing diverse foodstuffs such as potatoes and onions), agriculture is not a principal economic activity of the municipality.

== Twin towns ==
- Noisy-le-Roi, France, since 2004

== See also ==
- List of municipalities in Valencia
