= Rafelbunyol =

- Municipality
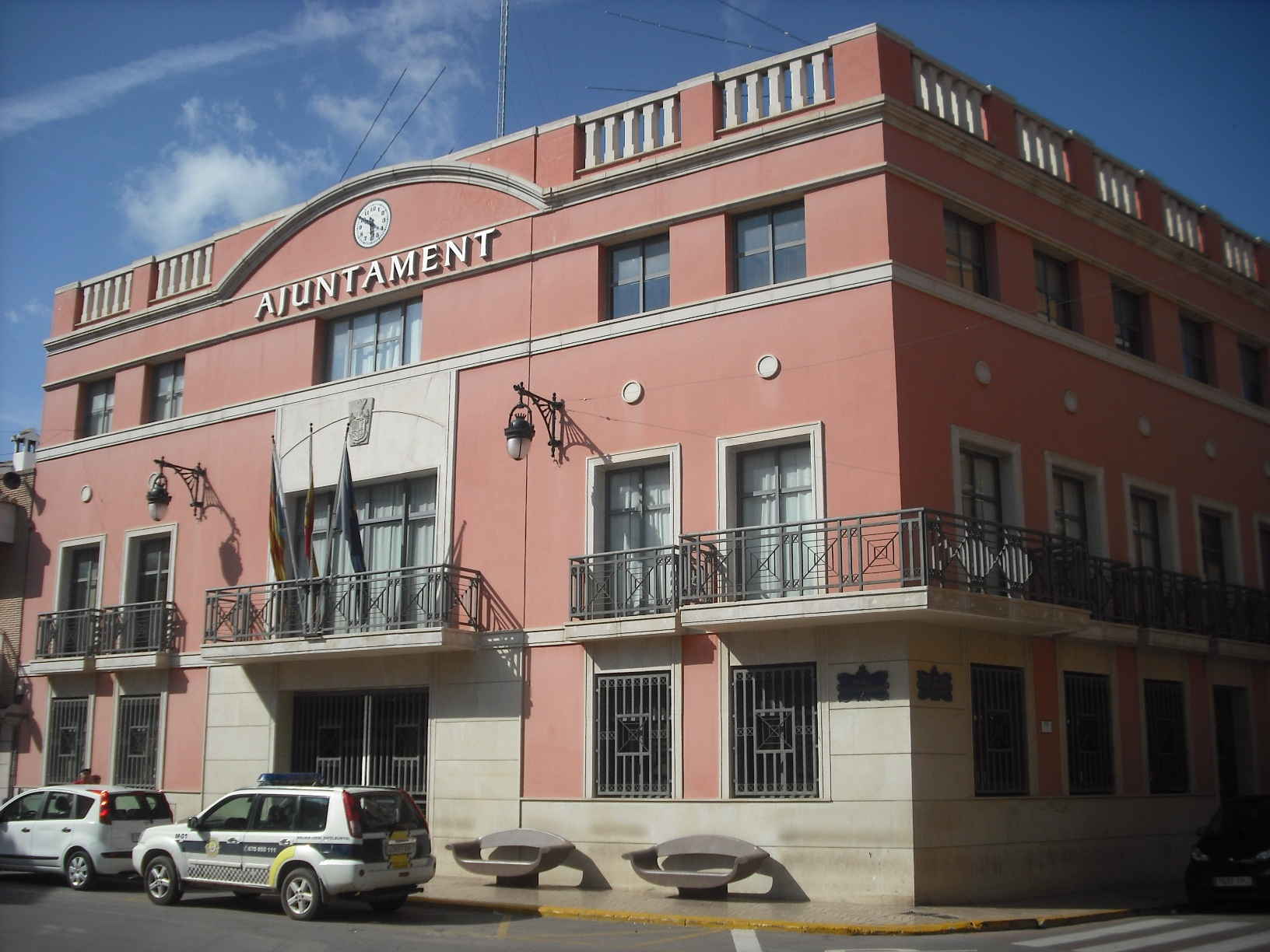
- Town hall

- Coat of arms

- Location in Spain
- Coordinates: 39°35′32″N 0°20′3″W
- Country: Spain
- Autonomous community: Valencian Community
- Province: Valencia
- Comarca: Horta Nord
- Judicial district: Massamagrell

Government
  - Alcalde: Jaime García García

Area
  - Total: 4.2 km^{2} (1.6 sq mi)
- Elevation: 32 m (105 ft)

Population (2025-01-01)
  - Total: 9,974
  - Density: 2,400/km^{2} (6,200/sq mi)
- Demonym(s): Rafelbuñolense; Rafelbunyoler(a)
- Time zone: UTC+1 (CET)
  - Summer (DST): UTC+2 (CEST)
- Postal code: 46138
- Official language(s): Valencian
- Website: Official website

Rafelbunyol (Valencian: [raˌfɛlbuˈɲɔl]) is a municipality in the comarca of Horta Nord in the Valencian Community, Spain.

== See also ==
- List of municipalities in Valencia
