= Rocafort =

- Municipality
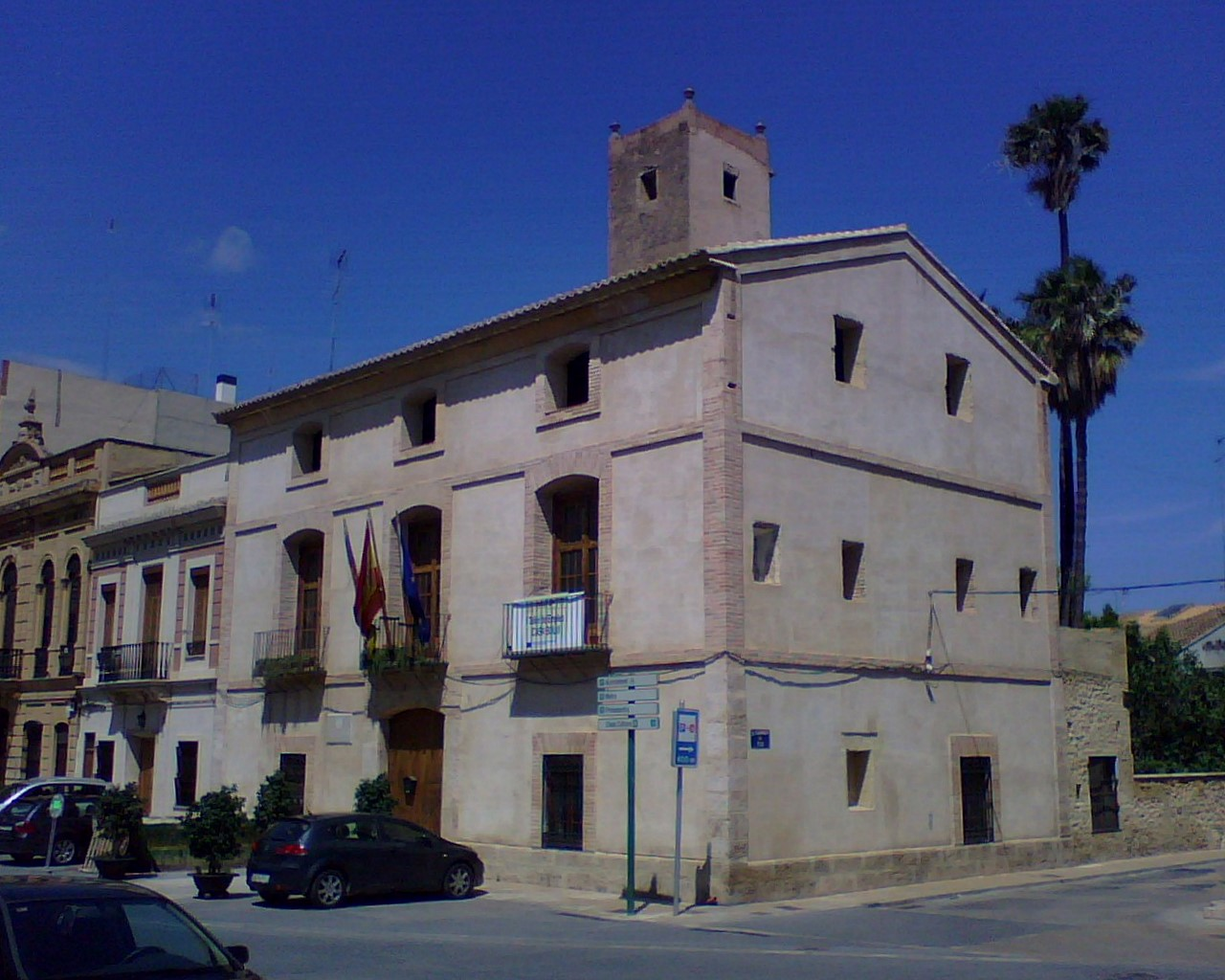
- Town hall

- Coat of arms

- Location in Spain
- Coordinates: 39°31′50″N 0°24′36″W
- Country: Spain
- Autonomous community: Valencian Community
- Province: Valencia
- Comarca: Horta Nord
- Judicial district: Moncada

Area
  - Total: 2.3 km^{2} (0.89 sq mi)

Population (2025-01-01)
  - Total: 7,751
  - Density: 3,400/km^{2} (8,700/sq mi)
- Demonym(s): Rocafortà, rocafortana
- Time zone: UTC+1 (CET)
  - Summer (DST): UTC+2 (CEST)
- Postal code: 46111
- Official language(s): Valencian
- Website: www.rocafort.es

Rocafort (Valencian: [ˌrɔkaˈfɔɾt], also [ˌrɔkɔˈfɔɾt]) is a municipality in the comarca of Horta Nord in the Valencian Community, Spain.

Rocafort is served by Rocafort station, on line 1 of the Metrovalencia railway system.

== See also ==
- List of municipalities in Valencia
