= Massalfassar =

Massalfassar Masalfasar
- Municipality
- Masalfasar
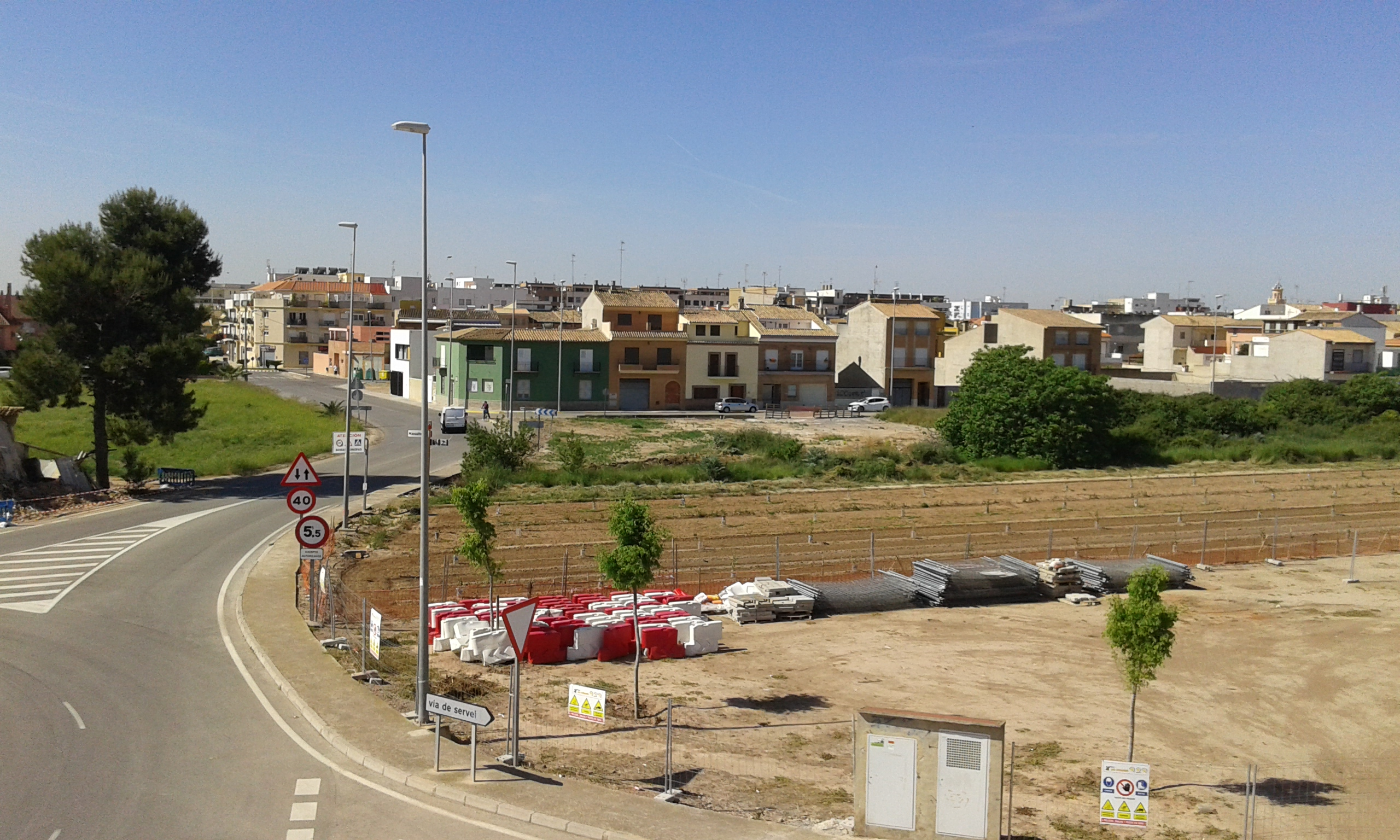

- Flag Coat of arms

- Location in Spain
- Coordinates: 39°33′40″N 0°19′30″W
- Country: Spain
- Autonomous community: Valencian Community
- Province: Valencia
- Comarca: Horta Nord
- Judicial district: Massamagrell

Government
  - Alcalde: Joaquín Soler Garibo (2003) (PP)

Area
  - Total: 2.5 km^{2} (0.97 sq mi)
- Elevation: 9 m (30 ft)

Population (2025-01-01)
  - Total: 2,716
  - Density: 1,100/km^{2} (2,800/sq mi)
- Demonym: Massalfassarí/na
- Time zone: UTC+1 (CET)
  - Summer (DST): UTC+2 (CEST)
- Postal code: 46560
- Official language(s): Valencian
- Website: Official website

Massalfassar is a municipality in the comarca of Horta Nord in the Valencian Community, Spain.

== See also ==
- List of municipalities in Valencia
