= Albalat dels Sorells =

- Municipality
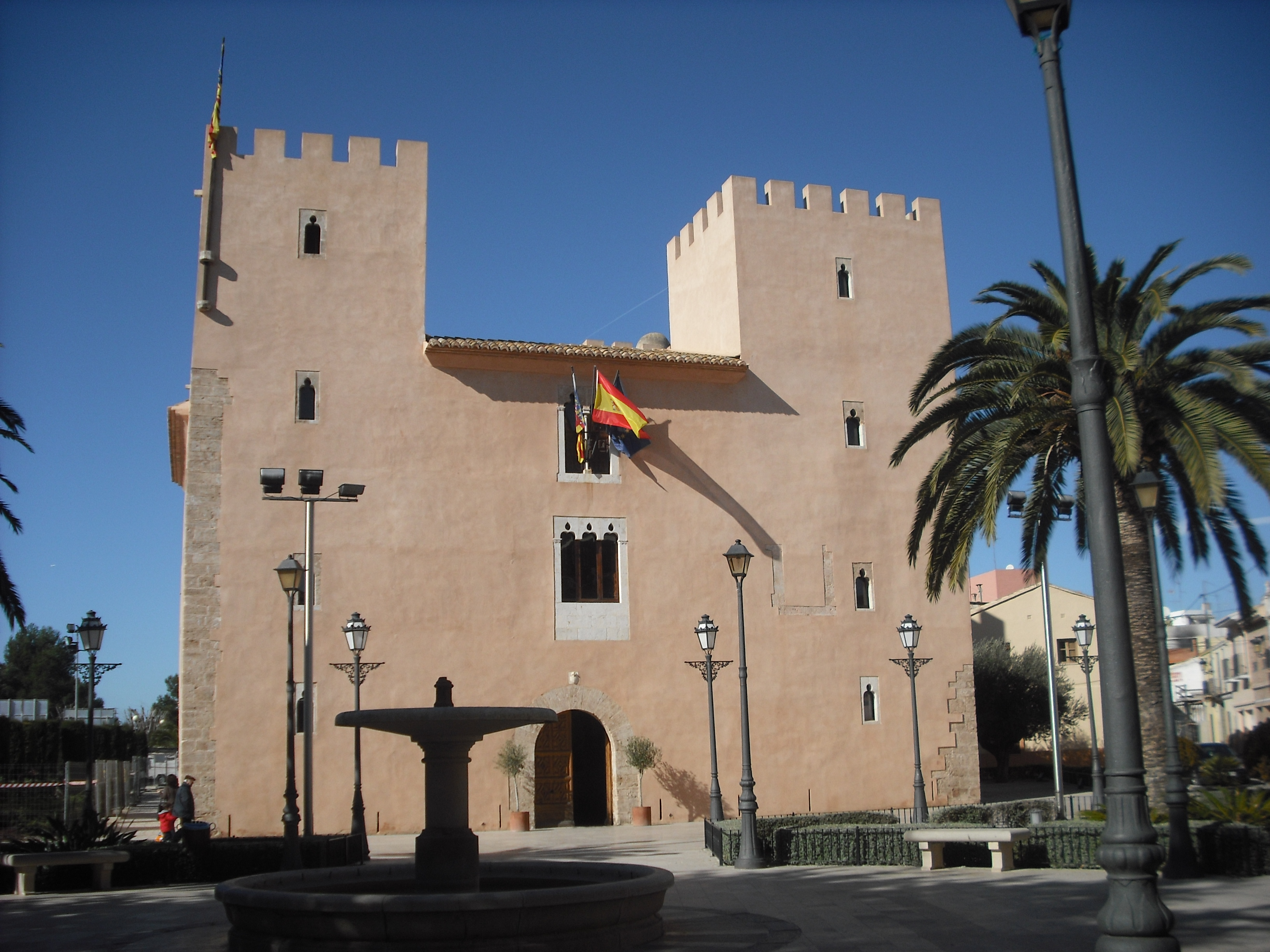
- Town hall

- Coat of arms

- Location in Spain
- Coordinates: 39°32′36″N 0°20′46″W
- Country: Spain
- Autonomous community: Valencian Community
- Province: Valencia
- Comarca: Horta Nord
- Judicial district: Montcada

Government
  - Alcalde: Nicolau Claramunt Ruiz

Area
  - Total: 4.62 km^{2} (1.78 sq mi)
- Elevation: 10 m (33 ft)

Population (2025-01-01)
  - Total: 4,368
  - Density: 945/km^{2} (2,450/sq mi)
- Demonyms: Albalatà, albalatana
- Time zone: UTC+1 (CET)
  - Summer (DST): UTC+2 (CEST)
- Postal code: 46135
- Official language(s): Valencian
- Website: Official website

Albalat dels Sorells is a municipality in the comarca of Horta Nord in the Valencian Community, Spain.

== Notable people ==
- Nerea Martí (born 2002), racing driver

== See also ==
- List of municipalities in Valencia
