= Meliana =

- Municipality
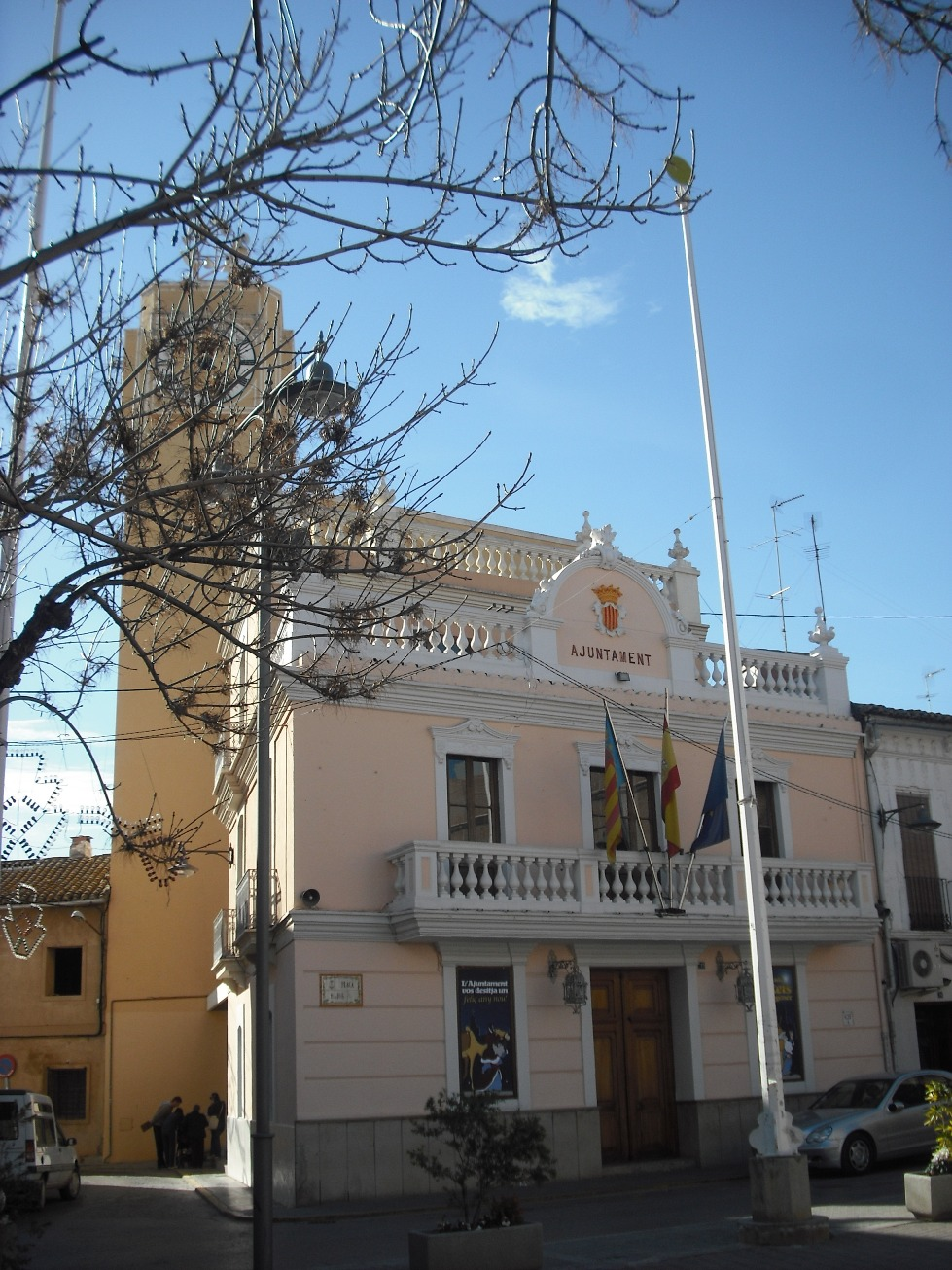
- Town hall

- Coat of arms

- Location in Spain
- Coordinates: 39°31′38″N 0°20′57″W
- Country: Spain
- Autonomous community: Valencian Community
- Province: Valencia
- Comarca: Horta Nord
- Judicial district: Moncada

Government
  - Alcalde: Josep Riera

Area
  - Total: 4.7 km^{2} (1.8 sq mi)
- Elevation: 12 m (39 ft)

Population (2025-01-01)
  - Total: 11,055
  - Density: 2,400/km^{2} (6,100/sq mi)
- Demonym: Melianer/a
- Time zone: UTC+1 (CET)
  - Summer (DST): UTC+2 (CEST)
- Postal code: 46133
- Official language(s): Valencian and Spanish
- Website: Official website

Meliana (Valencian pronunciation: [meliˈana]) is a municipality in the comarca of Horta Nord in the Valencian Community, Spain. Meliana was home to a mosaic tile factory circa 1860, which gained some recognition for its experimentation on methods that encouraged workers to react productively in response to the high competition in the textile industry. This task continued until the 1880s, until these practices began to be criticised as exploitative and unethical by a regional newspaper.

== See also ==
- List of municipalities in Valencia
