= Bonrepòs i Mirambell =

- Municipality
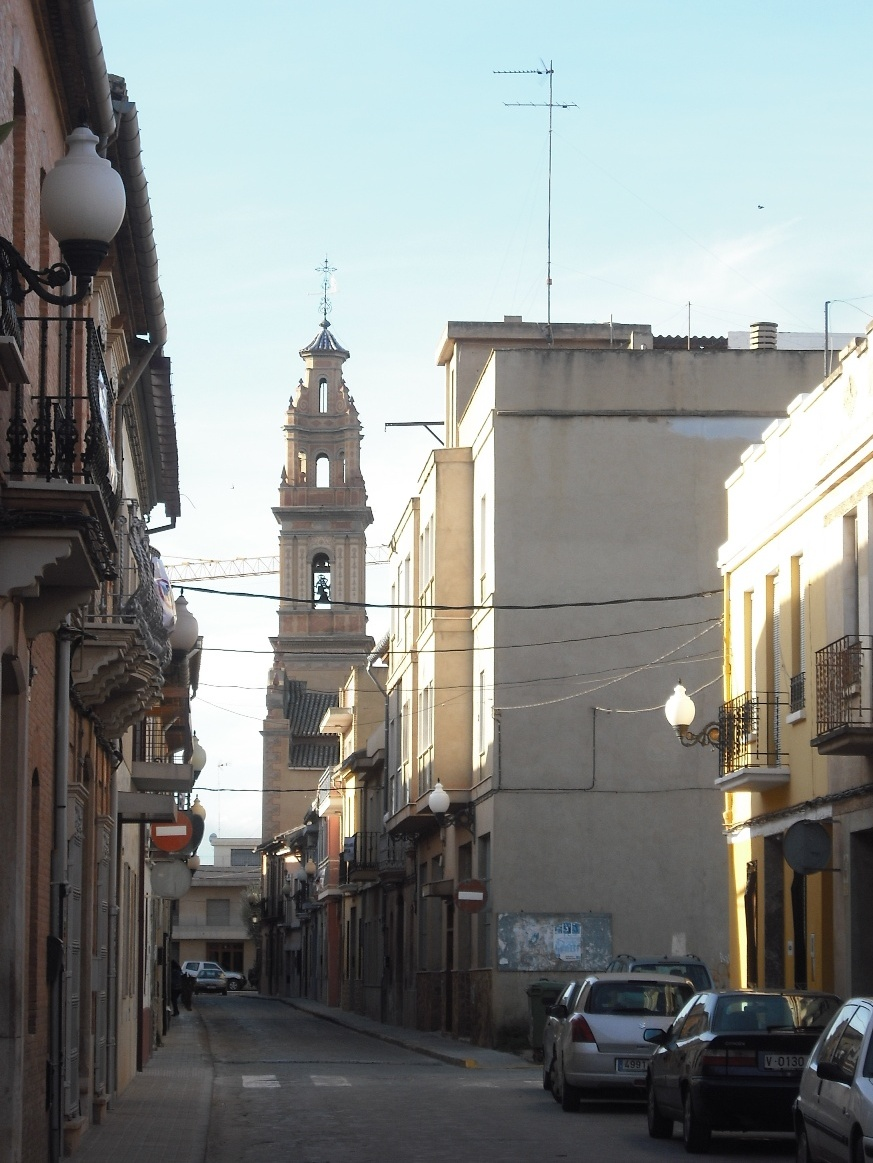

- Coat of arms

- Location in Spain
- Coordinates: 39°31′14″N 0°21′54″W
- Country: Spain
- Autonomous community: Valencian Community
- Province: Valencia
- Comarca: Horta Nord
- Judicial district: Moncada

Government
  - Alcalde: Vicenta Boix i Palanca

Area
  - Total: 1.05 km^{2} (0.41 sq mi)
- Elevation: 27 m (89 ft)

Population (2025-01-01)
  - Total: 4,115
  - Density: 3,920/km^{2} (10,200/sq mi)
- Demonym(s): Bonrepostí/na, Mirambellano/a
- Time zone: UTC+1 (CET)
  - Summer (DST): UTC+2 (CEST)
- Postal code: 46131
- Official language(s): Valencian

Bonrepòs i Mirambell is a municipality in the comarca of Horta Nord in the Valencian Community, Spain.

== Famous persons ==
- Carlos Soler, football player

== See also ==
- List of municipalities in Valencia
