= Vinalesa =

- Municipality
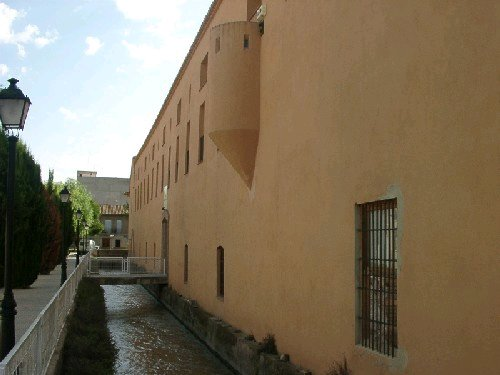

- Coat of arms

- Location in Spain
- Coordinates: 39°32′17″N 0°22′14″W
- Country: Spain
- Autonomous community: Valencian Community
- Province: Valencia
- Comarca: Horta Nord
- Judicial district: Montcada

Government
  - Alcalde: Julio Martínez Blat

Area
  - Total: 1.53 km^{2} (0.59 sq mi)
- Elevation: 14 m (46 ft)

Population (2025-01-01)
  - Total: 3,572
  - Density: 2,330/km^{2} (6,050/sq mi)
- Demonym: Vinalesino/a
- Time zone: UTC+1 (CET)
  - Summer (DST): UTC+2 (CEST)
- Postal code: 46114
- Official language(s): Valencian
- Website: Official website

Vinalesa is a municipality in the comarca of Horta Nord in the Valencian Community, Spain.

== Demography ==
Evolution of population
1900	1910	1920	1930	1940	1950	1960	1970	1981	1991	2000	2005	2007	2011
1.272	1.463	1.681	1.866	1.872	2.161	2.062	2.210	2.414	2.216	2.341	2.592	2.783	3.166

== See also ==
- List of municipalities in Valencia
