= Tavernes Blanques =

Tavernes Blanques Tabernes Blanques
- Municipality
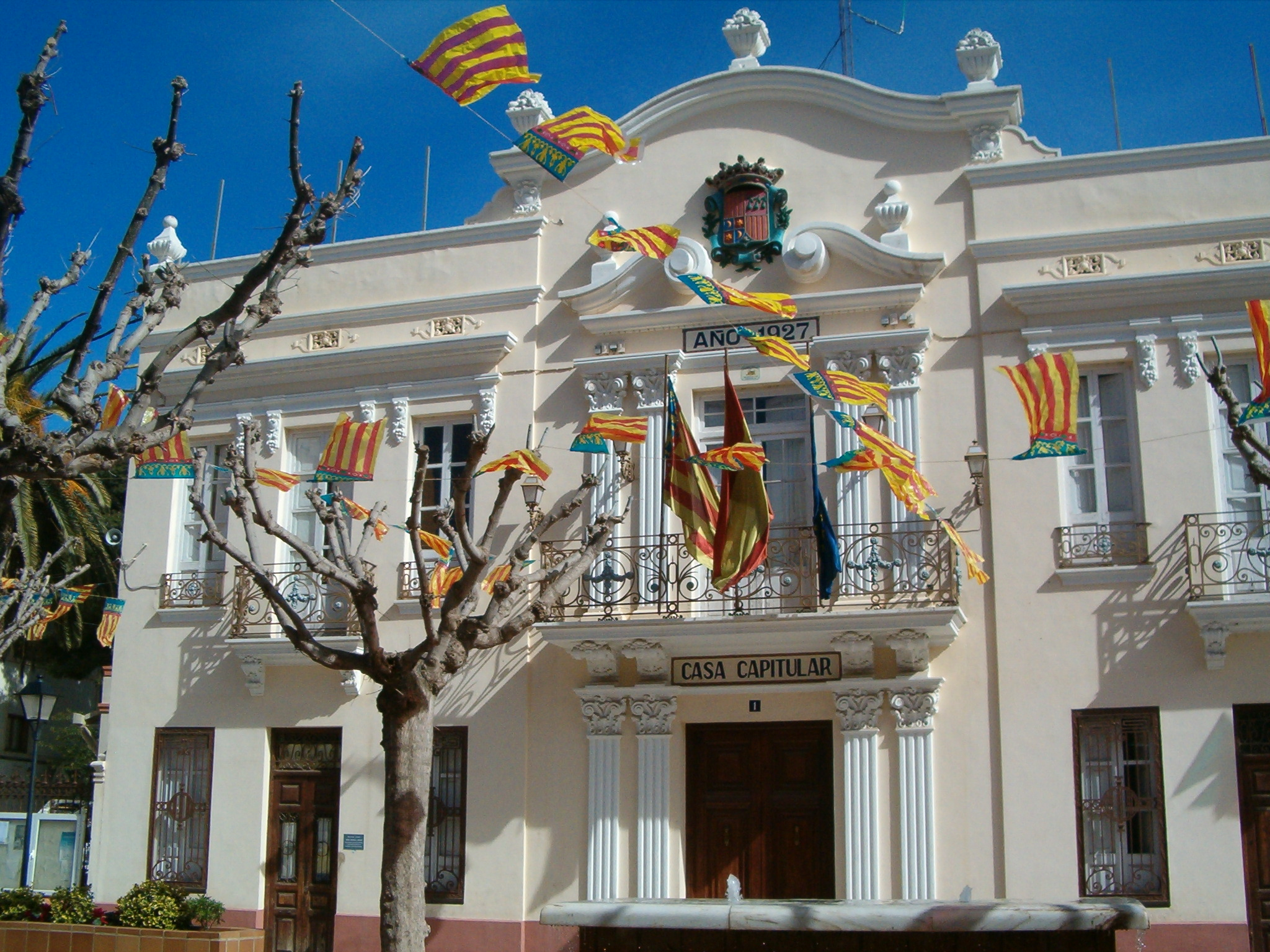
- Town hall

- Coat of arms

- Location in Spain
- Coordinates: 39°30′30″N 0°21′56″W
- Country: Spain
- Autonomous community: Valencian Community
- Province: Valencia
- Comarca: Horta Nord
- Judicial district: Montcada

Government
  - Alcaldesa: Maria del Carmen Marco Aguilar

Area
  - Total: 0.70 km^{2} (0.27 sq mi)
- Elevation: 12 m (39 ft)

Population (2025-01-01)
  - Total: 9,824
  - Density: 14,000/km^{2} (36,000/sq mi)
- Demonym: Tavernero/a
- Time zone: UTC+1 (CET)
  - Summer (DST): UTC+2 (CEST)
- Postal code: 46016
- Official language(s): Spanish, Valencian
- Website: Official website

Tavernes Blanques (Valencian: [taˈvɛɾnez ˈblaŋkes], Spanish: Tabernes Blanques [taˈβeɾnes ˈβlaŋkes] is a municipality in the comarca of Horta Nord in the Valencian Community, Spain.

== See also ==
- List of municipalities in Valencia
