= Foios =

- Municipality
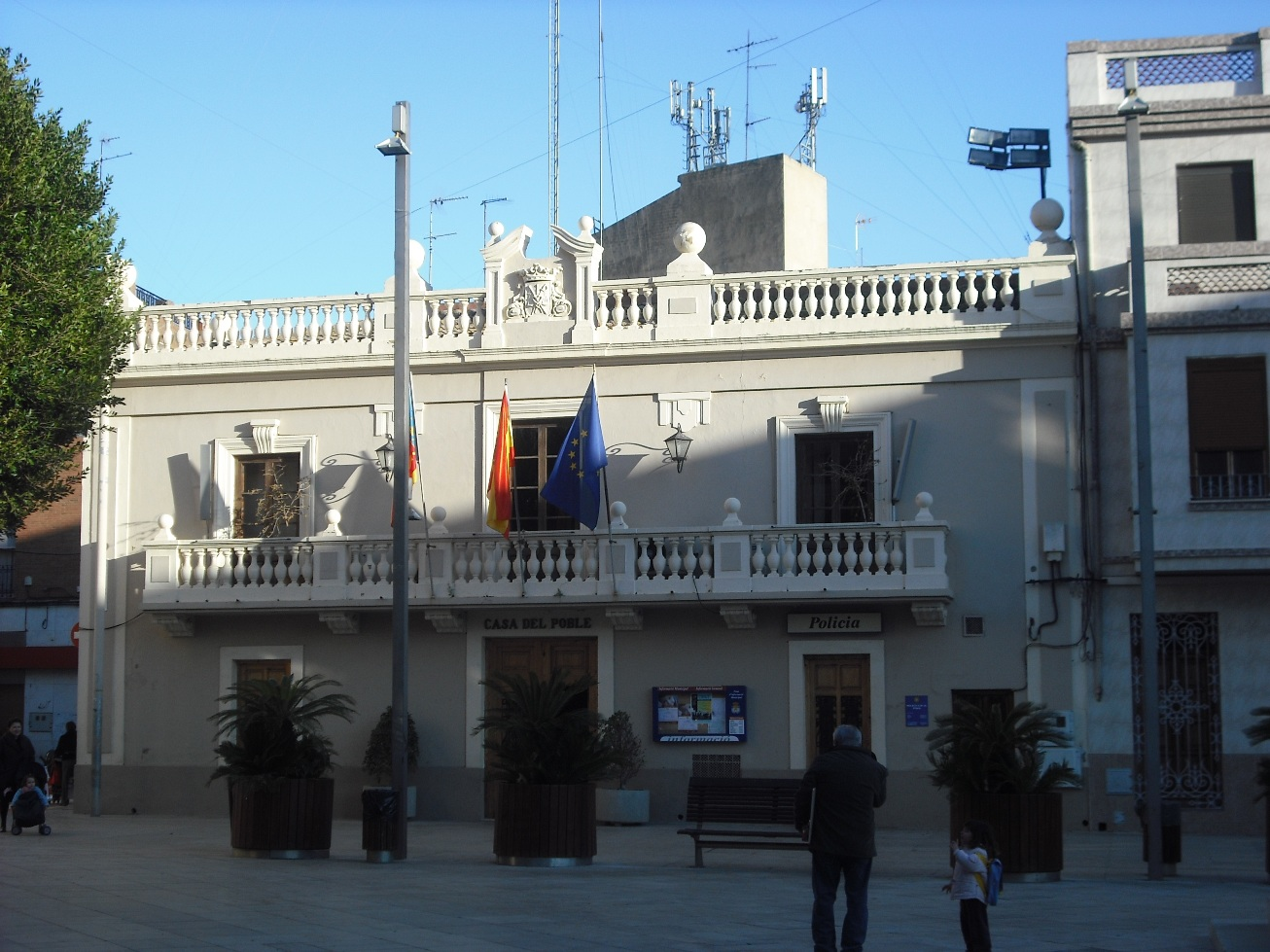
- Town hall

- Coat of arms

- Location of Foios Foios (Valencian Community) Foios (Spain)
- Coordinates: 39°32′19″N 0°21′24″W
- Country: Spain
- Autonomous community: Valencian Community
- Province: Valencia
- Comarca: Horta Nord
- Judicial district: Montcada

Government
  - Alcalde: Héctor Bueno

Area
  - Total: 6.5 km^{2} (2.5 sq mi)
- Elevation: 8 m (26 ft)

Population (2025-01-01)
  - Total: 7,995
  - Density: 1,200/km^{2} (3,200/sq mi)
- Demonym: Foiero/a
- Time zone: UTC+1 (CET)
  - Summer (DST): UTC+2 (CEST)
- Postal code: 46134
- Official language(s): Valencian
- Website: Official website

Foios (Valencian pronunciation: [ˈfɔjos]) is a municipality in the comarca of Horta Nord in the Valencian Community, Spain. It has a population of 7,342 (INE 2019).

== Name ==
According to Gaspar Juan Escolano, the name Foios comes from Latin Fundus which means "Inheritance" or "Farm".

== History ==
Flat of Foios (Plana de Foyos) is known as the remains of a Roman villa of the Alteimperial period. However, the current land comes from an Al-Andalus Rahal, mentioned in 1235 and conquered by Jaime I in 1237. The king gave it to Roderic Eiximen of Llúcia on August 1 of the same year, who transferred it to the Díez family in 1238. In 1247 the lands were in ownership of a man by the name of Guillem and, after few sales and partitions, Ramon Vilanova bought the lordship in 1386. Several years later Foios returned to the Crown of Aragon as Villa Real and did not become a property again.

== Politics ==
Foios is governed by a local corporation formed by councilors elected every four years by universal suffrage that elects a mayor. The electoral census is composed of all registered residents in the town who are over 18 years old and nationals of Spain and the other member countries of the European Union. According to the provisions of the General Electoral Regime Law, which establishes the number of eligible councilors based on the population of the municipality, the municipal corporation of Foios is formed by 13 councilors. The current headquarters of the Foios City Council is situated in the town square. The City Council of Foios is currently chaired by the Coalició Compromís and PSPV-PSOE (Socialist Party of the Valencian Country). It consists of 8 councilors of these parties. The opposition consists of 2 representatives of the PP (People's Party), 2 of Más Foios and 1 of VOLEM.

== Notable people ==
- Ferran Torres, footballer for Paris Saint-Germain FC and the Spanish national team.

== See also ==
- List of municipalities in Valencia
