= Almàssera =

- Municipality
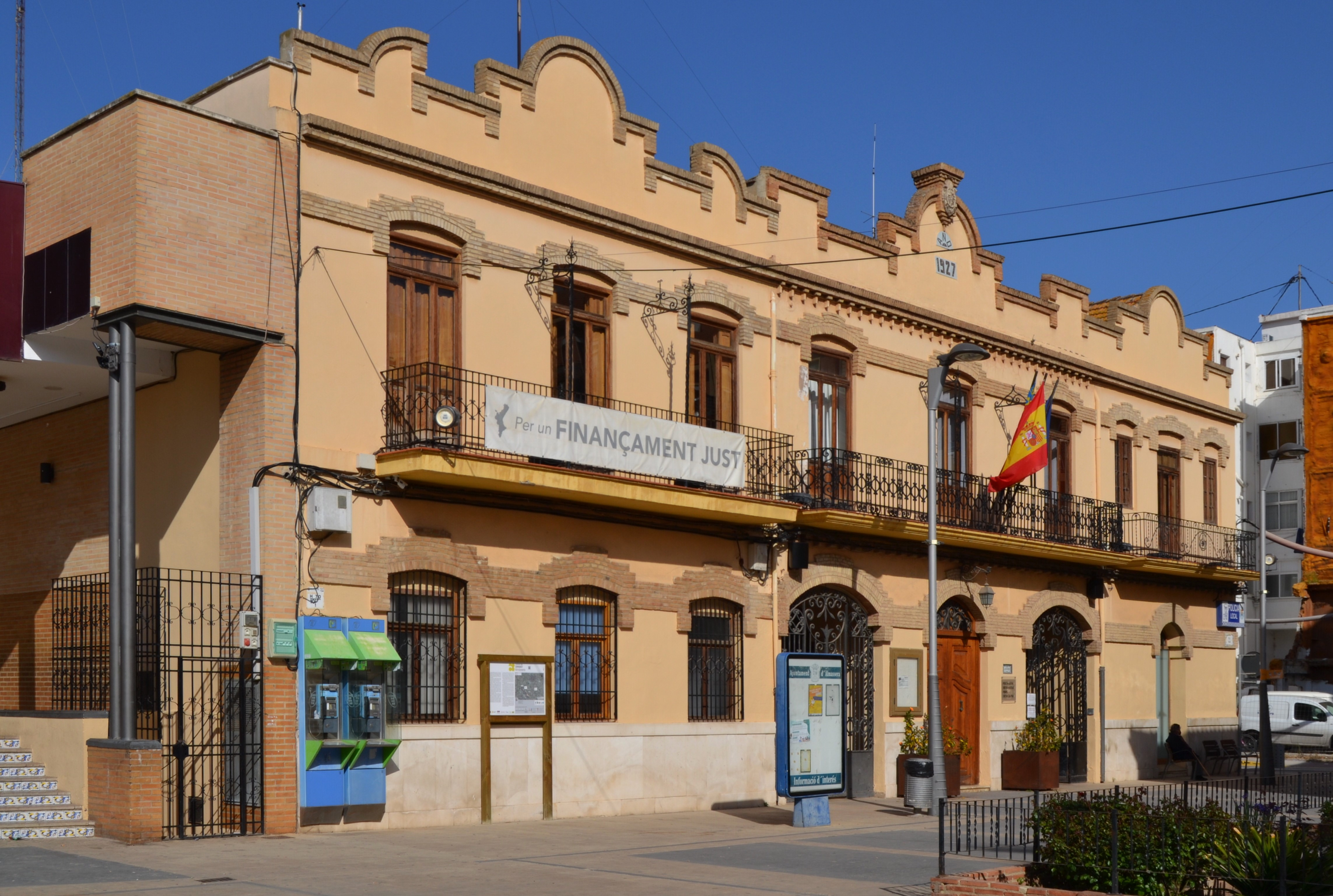
- Town hall

- Coat of arms

- Location in Spain
- Coordinates: 39°30′42″N 0°21′22″W
- Country: Spain
- Autonomous community: Valencian Community
- Province: Valencia
- Comarca: Horta Nord
- Judicial district: Montcada

Government
  - Alcaldesa: Laura Roig Panach (2011) (PP)

Area
  - Total: 2.70 km^{2} (1.04 sq mi)
- Elevation: 10 m (33 ft)

Population (2025-01-01)
  - Total: 7,887
  - Density: 2,920/km^{2} (7,570/sq mi)
- Demonyms: almasserins, rabosos
- Time zone: UTC+1 (CET)
  - Summer (DST): UTC+2 (CEST)
- Postal code: 46132
- Official language(s): Valencian
- Website: Official website

Almàssera is a municipality in the comarca of Horta Nord in the Valencian Community, Spain. The name is Arabic for "mill", meaning the olive mills that were established there. In Spanish it is called 'Almácera'.

== See also ==
- List of municipalities in Valencia
