= Centro de Estudios Universitarios =

Fundación Universitaria San Pablo CEU
- Fundación Universitaria San Pablo CEU
- Formation: January 1933; 93 years ago
- Founder: Ángel Herrera Oria
- Type: Educational foundation
- Headquarters: Madrid, Spain
- Location: Spain
- President: José Masip Marzá
- Parent organization: Asociación Católica de Propagandistas
- Website: www.ceu.es

The former Centro de Estudios Universitarios (CEU), currently called Fundación Universitaria San Pablo CEU, is a foundation for the development of education founded by the Catholic Propagandistic Association (ACdP).

Out of the many academic institutions it runs, it is mainly known for the prestigious universities; in Madrid, CEU San Pablo University, in Barcelona, Abat Oliba CEU University and CEU Cardenal Herrera University in Valencia.

== History ==
Fundación Universitaria CEU was created in 1933 in Madrid, by the Asociación Católica de Propagandistas (Catholic Association of Propagandists) on the initiative of its first President, the Servant of God Ángel Herrera Oria. In 1972 the 'Centro de Estudios Universitarios' became the 'Fundación Universitaria San Pablo CEU', as we know it today. The original faculty consisted of prestigious teachers, many of whom, over time, became professors or ministers, and some have even reached the episcopate. In 1945, the institution received official recognition by the Ministry of Education as a center affiliated to the University of Madrid. The CEU Foundation then set up a teaching institute, under the name of St. Paul College, affiliated with the Complutense University of Madrid. In 1993, Herrera Oria's dream of founding a university was fulfilled when the CEU Foundation established the CEU San Pablo University in Madrid, capital of Spain. This was followed by the CEU Cardenal Herrera University, the first private school of law ever founded in Valencia. It has been associated to the University of Valencia since the early 1970s but the University took on its current name in 1999. The CEU Abat Oliva University is the third university established by the San Pablo CEU Foundation, and was founded in 2003. In 2005, all entities that are part of the institution were united under the name CEU.

== Institutions ==
Schools and colleges run by the foundation:

=== Universities ===
- CEU San Pablo University, Madrid (1993)
- CEU Cardenal Herrera University, Valencia (1999)
- CEU Abat Oliva University, Barcelona (2003)
- CEU Fernando III University. Sevilla (2023)

=== High schools ===
- Colegio CEU San Pablo, Claudio Coello (1971)
- Colegio CEU San Pablo, Valencia (1971)
- Colegio CEU San Pablo, Montepríncipe (1975)
- Colegio CEU San Pablo, Murcia (1975)
- Colegio CEU Jesús María, Alicante (2004)
- Colegio CEU Virgen Niña, Vitoria-Gasteiz (2010)

== Notable alumni ==
- Maria Rosa Calvo-Manzano, harp professor at the Royal Superior Music Conservatory of Madrid (Real Conservatorio Superior de Música de Madrid); one of the founding members of the RTVE Orchestra
- María José Catalá, Spanish professional road bicycle racer
- José M. de Areilza, secretary General of Aspen Institute España, an independent foundation which is a partner of the Aspen Institute in the US
- Santos González, won the Spanish National Time Trial Championship in 1999 and 2001; won in 2000 a stage in Vuelta a España, where he finished fourth
- Máxim Huerta, host of the El programa de Ana Rosa
- Adolfo Suárez Illana, Spanish politician, lawyer; eldest son of Adolfo Suárez y González, 1st Duke of Suárez; Spain's first democratically elected Prime Minister after the dictatorship of Francisco Franco
- Silvia Jato, Spanish TV presenter who was nominated for prizes like TP de Oro and model who took part in Miss Spain in 1989 (being Maid of Honour) and in Miss Europe in 1991
- Ana Milán, Spanish actress and model; best known for her roles in television series 7 vidas, Camera Café, Yo soy Bea and Física o Química
- Ana Pastor, Spanish journalist and anchorwoman
- Elsa Pataky, Spanish model, actress, and film producer known as Elena Neves in Fast Five and Fast & Furious 6
- Dalmacio Negro Pavón, Spanish university professor and author, member of the Spanish Royal Academy of Moral and Social Sciences
- Federico Martínez Roda, Spanish historian, member of the Real Academia de Cultura Valenciana and correspondent of the Real Academia de la Historia
- Javier Rupérez, Spanish politician, diplomat and writer; since 2006 he has held the rank of full Ambassador within the Spanish Diplomatic Service, which he joined in 1967
- Joseph H. H. Weiler, Joseph Straus Professor of Law and European Union at New York University Law School and President of the European University Institute in Florence

== Emeritus Professors ==
- Luis Núñez Ladeveze, Emeritus Professor at the Communications and Humanities Faculty. Coordinator of the CEINDO (Escuela Internacional de Doctorado de las Universidades CEU).
- Justino Sinova. Emeritus Professor at the Communications and Humanities Faculty. Director of El Debate de Hoy
