= Federico Martínez =

Federico Martínez may refer to:

- Federico Martínez Roda (born 1950), Spanish history professor
- Federico Martínez (footballer, born 1984), Uruguayan football forward
- Federico Martínez (footballer, born 1996), Uruguayan football left midfielder
