= ESET Technical School of Engineering =

Engineering school in Alfara del Patriarca, Spain

Coordinates: 39°33′N 0°24′W

- Escuela Superior de Enseñanzas Técnicas (E.S.E.T.)
- Established: 1987
- Parent institution: CEU Cardinal Herrera University
- Affiliations: Catholic
- Dean: Fernando Sánchez López
- Location: Alfara del Patriarca, Valencia, Spain
- Website: uchceu.es

The ESET Technical School of Engineering (acronym by which the Escuela Superior de Enseñanzas Técnicas - (E.S.E.T.) in Spanish) is the school of engineering of the CEU Cardinal Herrera University, located in Alfara del Patriarca (Valencia), Spain. Currently, the ESET School occupies a former industrial building converted character with 3000m2 for effect.

== History ==
ESET was funded in 1987 by the CEU Foundation as a technical school for industry workers and its study programmes were officially recognised by the Spanish Government.

During the 2013–14 academic year, it offers:

=== Undergraduate ===
- Degree in Architecture
- Energy engineering
- Industrial Design Engineering and Product Development
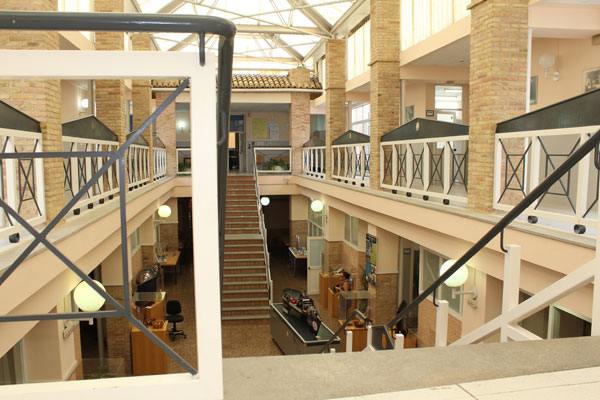
  ESET Technical School of Engineering
- Information Systems Engineering
- Computer Engineering
- Industrial Design

=== Postgraduate ===
The following are ESET's postgraduate degree programs for the 2013-14 school year:

- Master in Sustainable Architectural Design and Building Energy Assessment
- Master in Architectural Industrialisation and prefabrication
- Master in Engineering Design (with access to doctors)
- Master's Degree in Technological Innovation and Technical Textiles
- Master's Degree in Fashion Design Management and Operations

== Research ==
- Algorithms and numerical methods for large systems
- Biomedical Engineering
- Composites
- Robotics and Industrial Control

Students participate on Solar Decathlon for many years. The U.S. Department of Energy Solar Decathlon is an international competition that challenges 20 collegiate teams to design, build, and operate the most attractive, effective, and energy-efficient solar-powered house. The competition is presented by the U.S. Department of Energy and organized by the National Renewable Energy Laboratory (NREL). There is also a Solar Decathlon Europe, which was established by a 2007 agreement between the United States and Spain. Students participate on Eco-marathon, too. The Eco-Marathon is an annual competition sponsored by Shell, in which participants build special vehicles to achieve the highest possible fuel efficiency.

In 2012 CEU-UCH was one of the six universities in the world have been selected to present the best packaging designs of their respective countries in this "barometer" of international packaging design trends in order to award the best international packaging design on Salon International Emballage 2012. CEU Cardenal Herrera University's students on the Industrial Design and Product Development Engineering degree course at CEU-UCH presented its work with the rival proposals from five of the best Design schools in the world: Université du Québec à Montréal from Canada; Lahti University of Applied Sciences from Finland; Hochschule Hannover, Germany; Politecnico di Milano from Italy and Strate Collège from France who organized the competition.

== International relations ==
The CEU Cardenal Herrera University's ESET hosted their first International Staff Week under the title “From the local thinking to the global Project. Designing a sustainable World” in 2013. They were assisted by those in charge of International Relations at eleven universities from nine European countries like Technische Universität Ilmenau (Germany), St. Pölten University of Applied Sciences from Belgium, University of Toulouse II – Le Mirail, Université Catholique de Lille from France, TEI of Epirus from Greece, Kraków University of Economics from Poland, and North West Regional College from the United Kingdom. The international joint honours degree design, study and work experience exchanges, the signing of new Erasmus agreements and the creation of European Erasmus collaboration programmes were the topics discussed at this conference. This week of events is also part of the celebrations commemorating both the 25th anniversary of Design Education, which the CEU was responsible of pioneering on an international scale and the tenth anniversary since the studies of Architecture were first introduced to the CEU Cardenal Herrera University.

The Second International Week organized by the ESET will open under the title “iHome, from the modern house to the future home”. This session will focus on the trends of three educational fields of the ESET (Architecture, design and technologies) that would be applied to homes in the next years, with the contribution of invited teachers from Polytechnic University of Milan, the Danish Aarhus School of Architecture, the Porto's Higher Education School of Arts from Porto, Stockholm School of Economics in Riga, Academy of Arts, Architecture and Design in Prague, University of Coimbra, University of the Basque Country, Tallinn University of Technology.

In March 2014 ESET welcomes three “Pioneers into Practice” researchers from the European Climate-Knowledge and Innovation Community (Climate-KIC), a European climate change initiative supported by the European Institute of Innovation and Technology (EIT). The “Pioneers into Practice” programme is part of the Climate-KIC. Its aim is to create a new generation of top-class specialists, entrepreneurs and legislators in order to achieve a low-carbon economy in Europe. Stephaan Röell, Hajnal Szolga and Christian Dörr have worked on their projects on the Community of Valencia from CEU-UCH's ESET as host institution. It brings together a consortium of the main representatives of industry, academia and the regions in order to develop and exchange knowledge about innovations on a world scale to deal with climate change. The Community of Valencia, the only Spanish region participating in the programme, is one of the six participating regions, alongside Central Hungary, Emilia-Romagna, Hessen, Lower Silesia and the West Midlands.

=== University rankings ===
In 2012 CEU Cardinal Herrera University's ESET Technical School of Engineering selected as the number two design school by Architectural Digest in the article Top Ten section. Others within the top five include Parsons The New School for Design (1), Royal College of Art (3), Escola de Disseny i Art (4) and Istituto Europeo di Design (5). In 2013, according to the Shanghai Jiao Tong University which applies to Spanish universities criterion which develops the Academic Ranking of World Universities (ARWU), the CEU-UCH is the second Spanish private university, after the University of Navarra, in terms of research excellence. This ranking takes into account criteria such as the number of articles in index-linked publications by the Science Citation Index-Expanded and Social Science Citation Index in the year prior to evaluation.

== See also ==
- CEU Cardinal Herrera University
- CEU Foundation
