= Antonio Pelayo =

Spanish priest and journalist (born 1944)

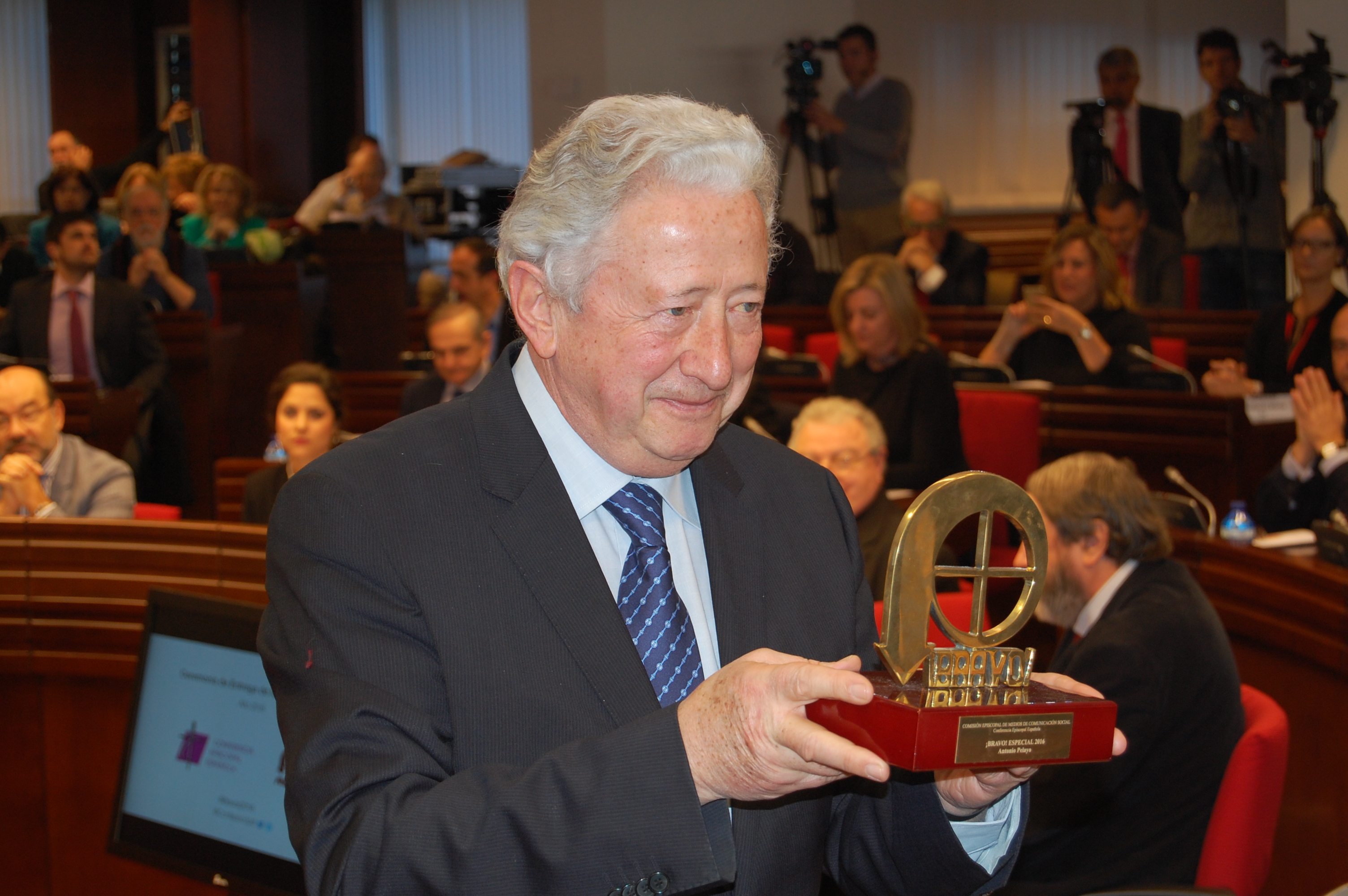
- Born: Antonio Pelayo Bombín; 11 January 1944 (age 82); Valladolid, Spain
- Education: Comillas Pontifical University
- Occupations: Journalist and Priest
- Employer: Antena 3

Antonio Pelayo Bombín (born 11 January 1944, Valladolid) is a Spanish priest and journalist, recognized for his extensive career as a Vatican and Italy correspondent for Antena 3 and the magazine Vida Nueva. He also served as a religious advisor to the Embassy of Spain to the Holy See until 2026.

During 2025, he has been under criminal investigation. The Rome Prosecutor's Office has charged him of sexual assault, requesting his indictment. In 2026 the Rome court sent him to trial.

== Biography ==
Pelayo studied ecclesiastical studies at the Pontifical University of Comillas and was ordained a priest in Madrid on February 2, 1968, on the Feast of the Presentation of the Lord. He later graduated in journalism from the Official School of Journalism of Madrid in 1970. He began his journalistic career at the newspaper Ya and the weekly magazine Vida Nueva.

In 1976, he was appointed correspondent for Ya in Paris, where he remained for nine years and served as president of the Foreign Press Association in France for two years. In 1986, he moved to Rome to continue his work as a correspondent. Since 1990, he has worked for Antena 3, covering news related to the Vatican and the Catholic Church. Throughout his career, he has accompanied Popes John Paul II, Benedict XVI, and Francis on numerous international trips.

== Recognitions ==
Throughout his career, Antonio Pelayo has received various awards and distinctions:

- Premio ¡Bravo! Especial: Awarded by the Spanish Episcopal Conference in 2016 in recognition of his professional career in press, radio, and television.
- Giuseppe De Carli Award: Granted in 2017 by the Giuseppe De Carli Cultural Association, this award recognizes his extensive career in the field of religious reporting.
- Calabria Award: Awarded by the Presidency of the Italian Republic, recognizing Pelayo as one of the best foreign correspondents in Italy.
- International Press Club of Madrid Award: Recognizing his outstanding journalistic work in the international field.
- Official Preacher of the Holy Week in Valladolid: In 2008, he was chosen to deliver the official Holy Week proclamation in his hometown, Valladolid.
