= Luis Núñez Ladevéze =

Spanish sociologist (born 1940)

Luis Núñez Ladevéze (born, 2 July 1940 in Madrid, Spain) is a Spanish social science researcher, writer and journalist. He has a doctorate in law and a PhD, a master's degree in journalism and full professor on leave of absence at the Universidad Complutense of Madrid. At present he is Emeritus Professor at the University of San Pablo-CEU. He was Managing Director of the Institute for Studies on Democracy and is founder and chairman of the editorial board of Doxa magazine and chairman of the advisory board of TRACOR Institute. Up to the year 2014, he was a practicing attorney-at-law of the Bar Association of Madrid.

Ladevéze is a father of four.

== Professional career ==
He began his professional career as a civil law (common law) professor at Complutense University in Antonio Hernández Gil's department, who was the supervisor of his doctoral thesis in law. He was also Director of the Spanish Parliamentary Communication Cabinet during the presidency of Hernández Gil. In 1977, he became senior lecturer in the Faculty of Journalism at the University of Barcelona. In 1978, he finally moved to the Complutense University of Madrid as senior professor, where he has been Head of the Department of Journalism and Deputy Dean at the Faculty of Information Sciences and Communication.

Ladevéze has worked as a journalist in different media in Madrid, both television and press: Director of the Investigation Department of RTVE, founder and first editor-in-chief and opinion editor of Nuevo Diario and Diario 16, editor of the ABC newspaper, Executive Director of Ya newspaper, where he was in charge of the editorial and Collaborations sections, he was a collaborator-journalist in the literary review section of Informaciones and El País newspapers.

He collaborated in the opinion-editorial pages of El Mundo, ABC, Expansión and Gaceta de los Negocios newspapers. In the latter, he wrote political opinion articles, and theatre and literary reviews. He directed Doxa magazine and, at present, is the Chairman of its Editorial Board where he presides over the Editorial Board Communication and is counsellor of a number of Social Science Magazines.

He founded and is Honorary President of the Children and Communication Association (Asociación Infancia y Comunicación), specialised in vulnerable members of the public and new technologies. The association's objective is to become a meeting point for researchers to investigate further on the role that media is playing in children's lives.

== Essays and novels ==
Ladevéze, in his philosophy essays, has specified the typical hallmarks of secular era democracies. If, in a formal sense, democracy is a procedure to choose and revoke periodically the ruler in a system of liberties, in the 21st century democratic societies confront new situations caused especially by the flows of migrants.

In 2005, Ladavéze published his novel "El impetú del viento" that, according to the critic Pilar Castro in ElCultural.com, is "a project fed with the aim to give a narrative solution to the speculative knowledge about a time of which we are debtors."

Ten years afterwards, Ladevéze published in "Sphera Nostra. En el confín del océano, la Atlántida perdida" a new version of the novel, revised and with the text adjusted to a narrative adapted to a digital format.

== Prizes and awards ==
- Marco Polo Award (Premio Marco Polo FIJET, 2014)
