= Ya (newspaper) =

Spanish newspaper

Ya (meaning "[Right] Now") was a Spanish newspaper published by Editorial Católica from 1935 to 1996. Its trademark was bought for a website that launched in July 2008.

== History ==
Among the founders of Ya was Cardinal Ángel Herrera Oria. The newspaper, which began in January 1935 during the Second Spanish Republic, was the most popular newspaper in Madrid by the end of Francoist Spain in 1975, with a circulation of 177,000. Ya had been met with suspicion by Francoist authorities for its acceptance of the Republic, and from 1953 to 1959 it had internal conflicts over whether to support or oppose the new regime. The latter faction were expelled from the publication. After censorship was loosened in 1966, Ya supported further democratic reform. The newspaper shut down in 1996, and ten years later its entire back catalogue was archived by Centro de Estudios Universitarios.

Ya was the second-oldest national newspaper in Spain at the time of its dissolution, having had several changes of ownership since 1988. Its final editor Rafael González blamed its decline not on its content, but rather on poor business decisions that led to the loss of its real estate. The newspaper's final owner, Aurelio Delgado of Diario de Ávila was attacked in the final editorial for the newspaper's demise, as he had failed in an attempt to obtain a 500 million peseta investment from the Community of Madrid. Domingo López, former president of Banco de Valladolid and owner of the defunct El Imparcial, offered to buy the trademark on condition that the Community inject the necessary credit, which was rejected.

On 1 July 2008, the newspaper was relaunched in a digital format. Some of its former employees believed this was to compete with Libertad Digital, a conservative website. By September, the intellectual property was secured for this new version, and editor Rafael Nieto predicted that a weekly magazine would be launched within a year, and a physical daily would circulate within five years. He said that the right-wing dailies La Razón and ABC had moved to the centre alongside the People's Party on social issues, and that there was a gap in the market for a Catholic daily.
