= CEU Cardinal Herrera University =

Private university in Valencia, Spain

Coordinates: 39°33′00″N 0°23′16″W

CEU Cardenal Herrera University
- Seal of CEU Cardenal Herrera University
- Former names: Centro Universitario San Pablo affiliated to the University of Valencia, University of Alicante and to the Polytechnic University of Valencia (1969–1999); Universidad CEU Cardenal Herrera (1999–)
- Type: Private
- Established: 1970
- Affiliations: CEU Foundation; EHEA; Erasmus Programme; Karolinska Institutet
- Chancellor: Vicente Navarro de Luján
- Academic staff: 1,222
- Students: 9,250
- Undergraduates: 8,198
- Postgraduates: 1,052
- Location: Valencia, Spain
- Campus: Valencia, Castellón and Elche
- Newspaper: El Rotativo
- Website: www.uchceu.es

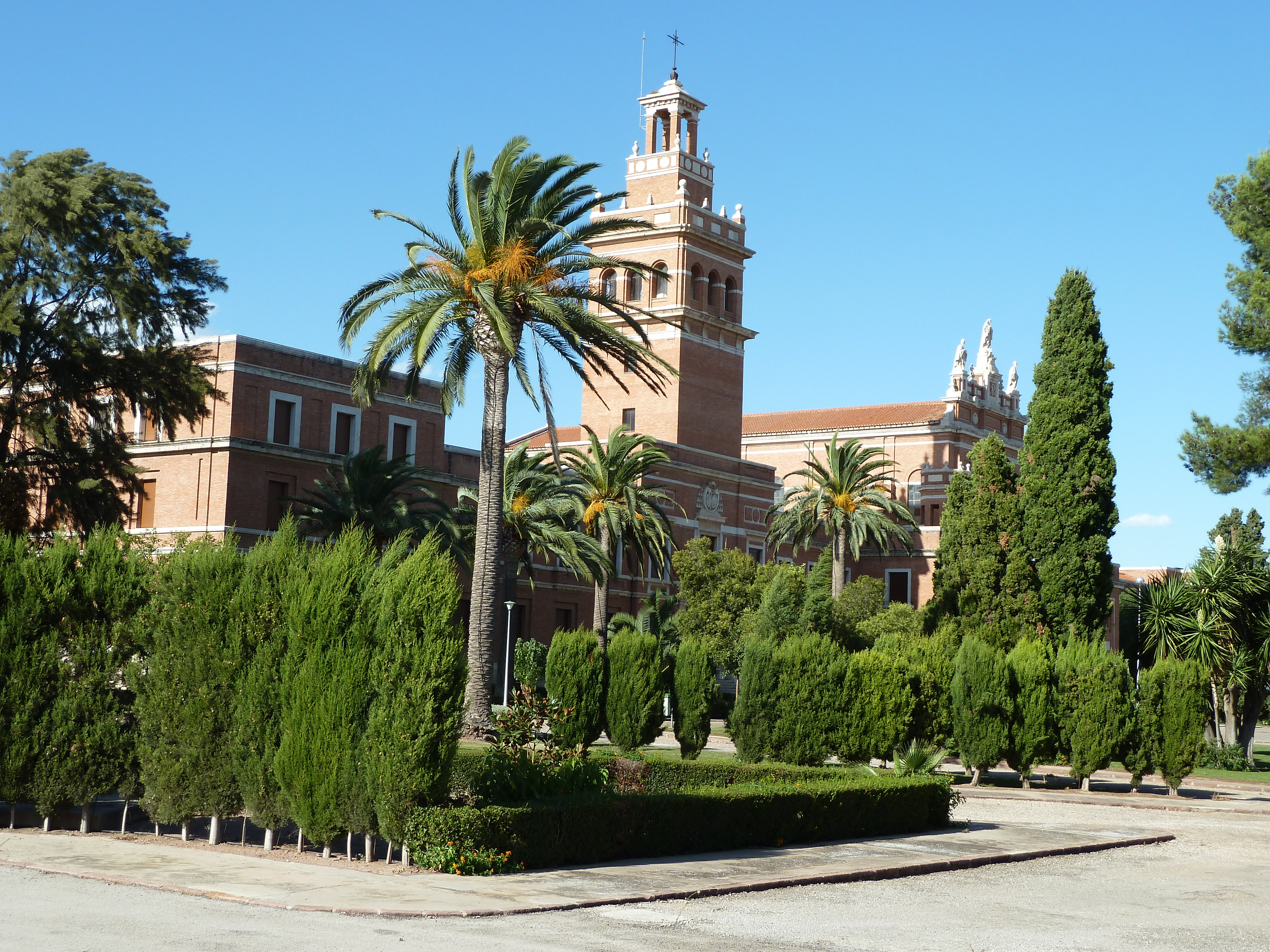
SemiMetroValencia

CEU Cardenal Herrera University (in Spanish: Universidad CEU Cardenal Herrera) is a private university located in the Valencian Community, Spain. It is part of the CEU Foundation, being the first private school of Law ever founded in Valencia. It has been associated to the University of Valencia and Polytechnic University of Valencia since the early 1970s but the university gained its current name in 1999.

The university has five faculties:

- Faculty of Health Sciences
- Faculty of Veterinary Medicine
- Faculty of Law, Business and Political Science
- Faculty of Humanities and Communication Sciences
- Technical School of Design, Architecture and Engineering (ESET)

CEU UCH offers degrees in English (Bachelor's degrees in architecture, veterinary medicine, dentistry, medicine, pharmacy, nursing studies and Gastronomy and Culinary Management), in French (Médecine Vétérinaire) and in Spanish. It boasts three modern campuses in Alfara del Patriarca (12 km from Valencia), Elche (Alicante) and Castellón. CEU UCH currently provides teaching to over 9,250 students from all over the world, with 35% of its students being international.

International rankings place CEU UCH at the top of the 23 Spanish private universities, rankings like Shanghai Jiao Tong University's Academic Ranking of World Universities (ARWU) placed CEU UCH the second Spanish private university, after the University of Navarra, in terms of research in 2013. In 2014 U-Multirank, a new global university ranking financed by the EU which assesses the performance of more than 850 higher education institutions worldwide, placed CEU-UCH as the tenth European university in agreement to regional involvement, scientific productivity and international orientation. THE World University Rankings 2021 and 2022 have included CEU among the best universities in the world.

== History ==
It is run by the San Pablo CEU University Foundation which is the biggest private educational group in Spain, which includes two other universities (CEU San Pablo University in Madrid and CEU Abat Oliva University in Barcelona), as well as many primary and secondary schools. It has been associated to the University of Valencia since the early 1970s. The history of CEU UCH dates back to 1971, when the first private school of Law was founded in Valencia. The university gained its current name in 1999. The Foundation inaugurated its work in Valencia in 1971 and in Elche in 1994. The Generalitat Valenciana approved the law of the creation of the now University CEU Cardenal Herrera, which has been functioning since the 2000–2001 year. Now almost 10,000 students from around the world study in the university, with 35% of the student community being international.

European Higher Education Area

The University Cardenal Herrera takes part in the Program of Academic Excellence and the Organization of the Knowledge "Platon" of the San Pablo CEU Foundation has started in collaboration with Harvard University and it belongs to the system of European Higher Education Area. The aim of "Platon" is the strengthening of the system of tutorships for the students and the teacher who accompanies to the implementation of a system of continuous assessment.

== Schools and faculties ==
CEU Cardenal Herrera University has five faculties:

Faculty of Humanities and Communication Sciences:

- Degrees in Journalism, Advertising, Audiovisual Communication, Sports, and Education

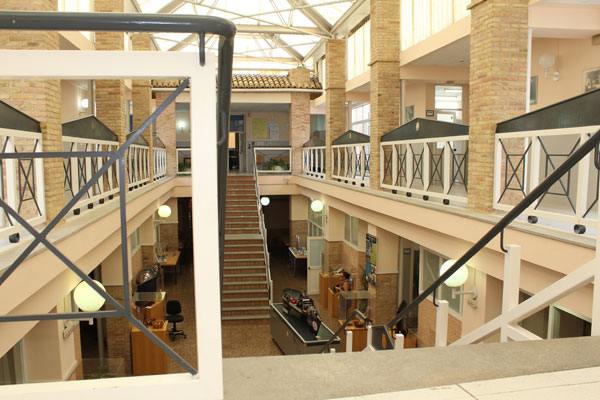
ESET Technical School of Engineering

ESET Technical School of Engineering:

- Degrees in Architecture and Industrial Design

Faculty of Law, Business and Political Science:

- Degrees in Law, Political Science, Marketing, and Business Administration

Faculty of Veterinary Medicine:

- Degree in Veterinary Medicine

Faculty of Health Sciences:

- Degrees in Physiotherapy, Nursing, Pharmacy, Dentistry, and Medicine

== University Masters ==
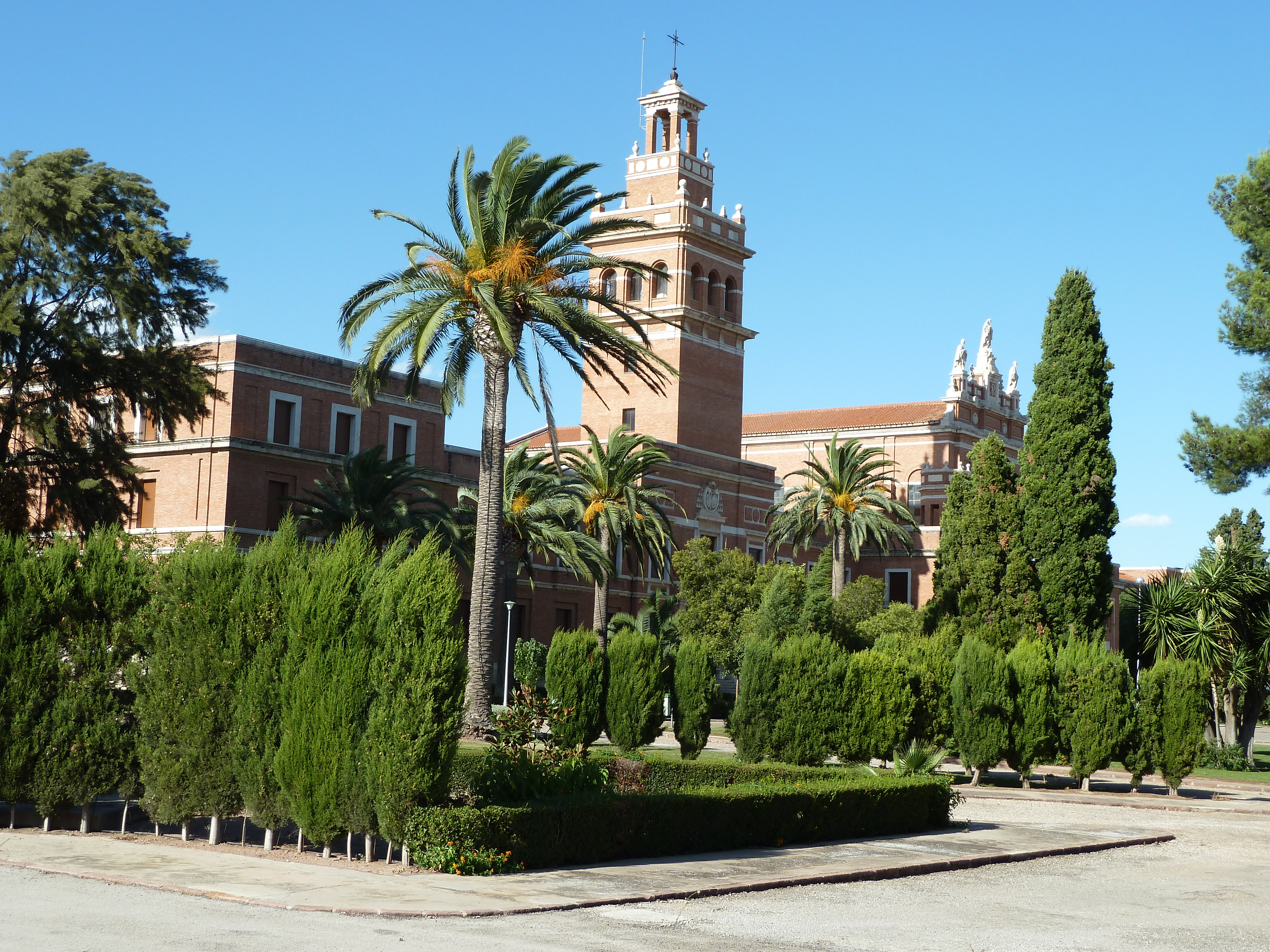
One of the views from Faculty of Health Sciences in Moncada

Faculty of Humanities and Communication Sciences :

- Master in Communication and Digital Branding
- Master's Degree in Creative Advertising and Branding
- European master's degree in Public Relations MARPA
- Master's Degree in Teacher Education Secondary Education and High School

Faculty of Law, Business and Political Science

- Master's Degree in Equal Opportunities Agents (online training)
- Master's Degree in Marketing
- Master in Finance (with access to a PhD)
- Master's Degree in policies and instruments for reducing CO_{2} emissions.

Faculty of Veterinary Medicine

- Master's Degree in Clinical Practice Management and Veterinary Centers

ESET Technical School of Engineering

- Master in Sustainable Architectural Design and Building Energy Assessment,
- Master in Architectural Industrialisation and prefabrication,
- Master in Engineering Design (with access to doctors),
- Master's Degree in Technological Innovation and Technical Textiles,
- Master's Degree in Fashion Design Management and Operations

Business School

- Master's Degree in Management and Project Management Centres and Sociosanitarios,
- Master in Cultural Management,
- Master's Degree in Occupational Health and Safety

Faculty of Health Sciences

- Master in Pharmaceutical Care and Pharmacy Care (with access to doctors),
- Master's Degree in Care physiotherapists in Physical Activity and Sport (with access to doctors),
- Specialisation master's degree in Nursing Care (with access to doctors),
- Master's Degree in Neurorehabilitation,
- Master's Degree in Organic Chemistry, Experimental and Industrial,
- University Master Osteopathic Manual Therapy (with access to doctors),
- Master in Orthodontics and Dentofacial Orthopedics
- master's degree Specialization in Nursing Care,
- Master in Pharmaceutical Care and Pharmacy Assistance,
- Physiotherapeutic Care Master in Physical Activity and Sport,
- Master in Neurorehabilitation,
- Master's Degree in Applied Nutrition to Health,
- Master's Degree in Orthodontics and Dentofacial Orthopedics,
- Master's Degree in Organic Chemistry, Experimental and Industrial,
- Master in Food Safety,
- Master's Degree in Osteopathic Manual Therapy

Elche Center

- Master's Degree in Teacher Education Secondary Education and High School
- Specialization master's degree in Nursing Care (with access to doctors)
- University Master Osteopathic Manual Therapy (with access to doctors)

== Campus ==
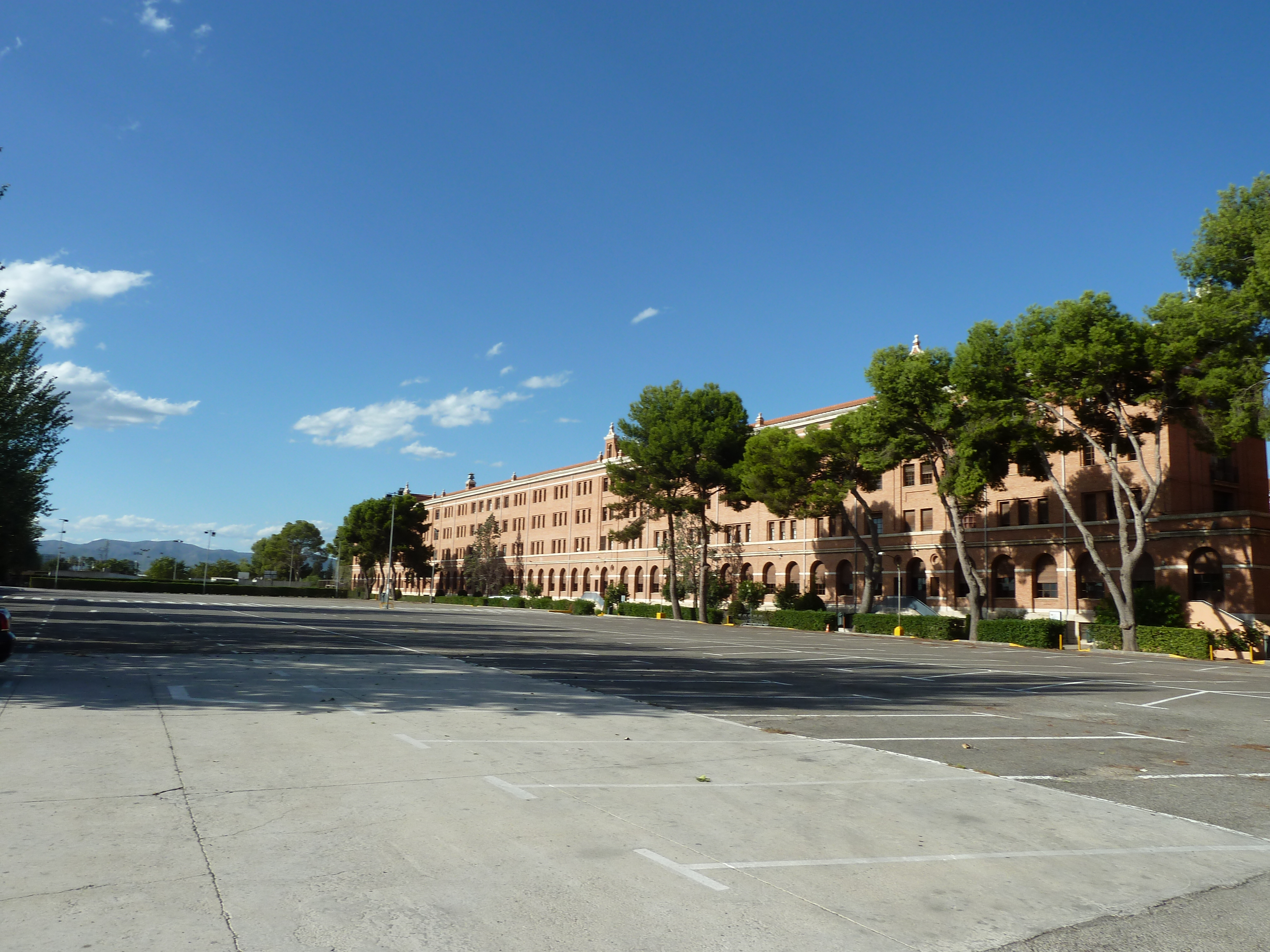
Valencia campus

CEU Cardenal Herrera University has three different campuses located in Alfara del Patriarca (Valencia), Elche and Castellón. All the main facilities, such as the central library and the International Relations Office, are located in its main campus in Alfara del Patriarca. The campus is very well connected to Valencia city centre, with a direct metro line (Line 1) and frequent bus service. It is also close to some of the privately run student accommodation residences. The university's brand new central library is a 5,000-square-metre (54,000 sq ft) building with a capacity for up to 700 students. Its learning facilities include several computer laboratories, 12 group study rooms and 7 research rooms. Audiovisual and Internet reference points are available in the Periodical and Media Libraries.

Medical students study at a newly built medical school building in Castellón de la Plana, which is an attractive town about an hour away from Valencia. The town is very close to Benicàssim, which is a popular beach resort. Despite its quiet and relaxed atmosphere, students can still enjoy great nightlife in the historical centre of Castellón de la Plana. The town is home to a large university hospital.

== Student life ==
At the moment, there are around 10,000 students in the university from all around Spain, especially Valencia, Murcia, Mallorca, Ibiza, and Albacete. Every year 700 students from other countries come to study their degree at the university, adding to those who come under European Exchange Programmes like Socrates, Erasmus and Leonardo.

The CEU Cardenal Herrera University has its own facilities for practical training of students, as the Center for Media Production and Multimedia, of 3,300 square metres (36,000 sq ft), with television sets, radio and photography, the Veterinary Hospital, a reference in the area of Valencia, the Zoological Faculty, with various types of livestock, the University Dental Clinic, with outpatient care, laboratory practices in basic biomedical sciences and clinical simulated for the area of health. They also have a Central Library Newspaper Library, with 700 seats for consultation and over 100,000 volumes.

The CEU Cardenal Herrera University publishes a monthly newspaper, The Rotary Diary, and also features a fully operational radio station, Radio CEU, which broadcasts for 12 hours daily and media company CEUMedia which has more TV Channel; both are run from the Faculty of Humanities and Communication Sciences

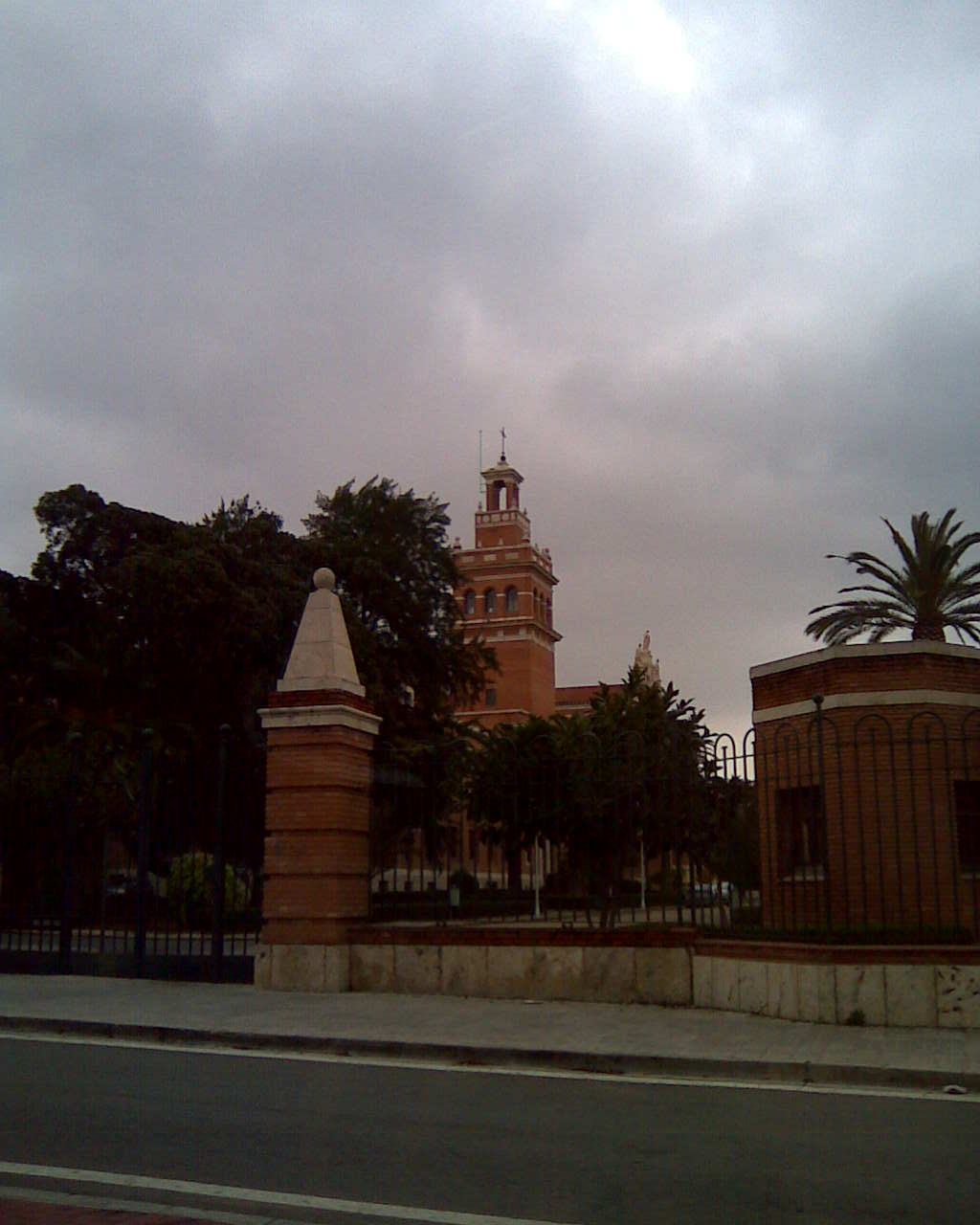
Moncada's campus view

The university features a number of social and sports-related groups. The university counts on a strong Erasmus-support group and every school features a Tuna, La Tuna del CEU-Cardenal Herrera (traditional Spanish band), which compete in the nationwide competitions and CEU Theatre, a formation in the classroom and the human growth across the art of the theatre.

In terms of sports, aerobics, gym, yoga, tennis, diving, tai chi, and numerous other courses are offered. In terms of team sports, the CEU UCH features male and female basketball, soccer, and volleyball divisions, chess, table-tennis and more. CEU UCH hosts regular sport competitions such as golf, football and volleyball tournaments. Internal university games are held several times a year, with all of the different schools competing.

CEU UCH offers Summer University which help eternal and new students, the formation in June and July the courses organize in the frame of the Summer university. Also offers Spanish language course' which the International Office helps foreign students with the procedures necessary to study at the university, and also with finding accommodation or learning Spanish. The university runs two Spanish courses per academic year for international students

== Academics ==
CEU UCH's academic programs operate on a semester calendar beginning in late September and ending in June.

=== University rankings ===
In 2012 CEU-UCH's ESET Technical School of Engineering was selected as the number two design school by Architectural Digest in the article Top Ten section. Others within the top five include Parsons The New School for Design (1), Royal College of Art (3), Escola de Disseny i Art (4) and Istituto Europeo di Design (5).

El Mundo's "Spain Best Universities Annual Report", placed CEU UCH in 6th position in 2006 2008 and its Degree in Audiovisual Communication ranked fourth "Spain Best Universities to study Audiovisual Communication" in 2006, 2010, 2011, 2012 and 2013. El Mundo said: "The facilities, practical work in small groups and personalized attention are aspects of the race that contribute to achieving and maintaining fourth".

CEU UCH was highly ranked by many international university rankings in 2013.

According to IUNE Observatory ranking	2002	2003	2004	2005	2006	2007	2008	2009	2010	2011
Placed in terms of Scientific publications	4	4	4	4	4	2	4	3	3	4
Placed in terms of scientific publications about Medicine and Pharmacology	3	4	2	3	4	2	4	3	3	4
Placed in terms of scientific publications about Experimental science and Life sciences	3	4	3	3	3	2	3	2	2	2
Placed in percentage of publications in journals	2	3	3	3	2	3	3	3	2	2

U-Multirank, an independent ranking with financial support in its initial years from the European Union, stands for "multi-dimensional ranking of higher education institutions". The first ranking assesses the overall performance of 879 universities, 1,200 faculties and 5,000 study programmes from 74 countries placed CEU-UCH as the tenth European university in agreement to regional involvement, scientific productivity and international orientation U-Multirank was launched on 13 May 2014.

As of 2021 and 2022, CEU Cardenal Herrera University has been included in THE World University Rankings, scoring particularly highly for citations of its research and for international outlook and is one of the leading Spanish institutions in these areas.

=== Research institutes ===
GROUPS AND RESEARCH

The CEU Cardenal Herrera University has opened research projects in collaboration with Generalitat Valenciana. Some of these lines of research examining issues such as the neural effects of consumption of drugs and alcohol, diseases such as leukemia or diabetes, drug design and media Internet. The university has three research institutes: the IDYCA (Institute of Drugs and Addictive Behavior), the IDIT (Institute of Design, Innovation and Technology) and IDEA (Institute for Environmental law and Ethics). In July 2013, CEU-UCH and Karolinska Institutet from Sweden signed the student's partnership and exchange agreement

Faculty of Veterinary Medicine: Endocrinology and pathophysiology of reproduction in ruminants and horses, Research Group on Experimental and Applied veterinary surgery, Improving food security in the production system and its derivatives, Veterinary ophthalmology, Parasitology and Parasitic Diseases, Pathology and Animal Health, Food safety in meat products, Ethology and Animal Welfare Section

Faculty of Health Sciences: Application of computational methods to the design and development of new compounds with biological activity, Pharmaceutical Care and Rational Use of Medicines, Cellular and molecular biology of cancer, Adult mesenchymal cells in the control of the inflammatory process in humans, Brain damage and Neuroregeneration, Development of dosage forms of application to the skin, Design and synthesis of compounds with therapeutic activity, Molecular diagnostics in clinical microbiology, Study of human milk: composition, manipulation and functional properties, GIDRAQ (Group for Research and Resource Development in Chemical Analysis), Neurodegenerative and neuroprotective mechanisms CEU Dentistry Clinic, equipped with dental laboratories, X-ray and sterilization rooms. In addition to this, has advanced technology and equipment as directed by the European guide lines in the dentistry industry.

Faculty of Humanities and Communication Sciences: Communication, participation and environmental awareness on the Internet, Communication campaign analysis and news coverage in the press, Bioethics Research Group, GIDYC. Research Group on disability and communication, OIMED (Centre for Research in Digital Media)

Technical School of Design, Architecture and Engineering (ESET): Algorithms and numerical methods for large systems, Biomedical Engineering, Composites, Robotics and Industrial Control. Students participate on Solar Decathlon many years. The U.S. Department of Energy Solar Decathlon is an international competition that challenges 20 collegiate teams to design, build, and operate the most attractive, effective, and energy-efficient solar-powered house. The competition is presented by the U.S. Department of Energy and organized by the National Renewable Energy Laboratory (NREL). There is also a Solar Decathlon Europe, which was established by a 2007 agreement between the United States and Spain. Students participate on Eco-marathon, too. The Eco-Marathon is an annual competition sponsored by Shell, in which participants build special vehicles to achieve the highest possible fuel efficiency.

Faculty of Law, Business and Political Science Cooperation and Development, Deliberative democracy, communication and citizenship, Taxation and climate change, ADEC Group (Water: law, business, political science and communication), Research Group in financial economics, Research Group on International Protection of Human Rights, Legal protection of investors in emerging markets unregulated rights GHG emission, The region as a historical paradigm, International Financial Reporting Standards in the field of International Carbon Markets, Religion and Right to Environment

== Notable people ==
Notable alumni includes for example Federico Martínez Roda, María José Catalá, a Spanish politician who belongs to the People's Party; Santos González, a Spanish professional road bicycle racer who won the Spanish National Time Trial Championship in 1999 and 2001 and won in 2000 a stage in Vuelta a España, where he finished fourth; Spanish actress and model Ana Milán who is the best known for her roles in television series 7 vidas, Camera Café, Yo soy Bea and Física o Química; Joana Chilet who is director of Canal Nou; Pepa Crespo who is Bioparc's director of communication; Máxim Huerta, host at the El programa de Ana Rosa.

Notable professors includes for example Manuel Zaera who works as Industrial engineering and Architecture teacher at the CEU-UCH and aerospace engineering at the European Space Agency. He worked ad professor at the Singularity University in 2010; Santiago Vega, Doctor of Veterinary Medicine from Complutense University of Madrid summa cum laude and master's degree from University of Lleida. Currently he is the Chancellor of the Faculty of Veterinary; José Enrique March, he graduated from CEU-UCH in advertising and currently he works as filmmaker; Manuel Ventimilla, professor at the CEU-UCH and at the Valencian Museum of Enlightenment and Modernity; Joaquín Ruiz, old student and currently audiovisual professor at the CEU-UCH. He won the prize for his documental "Calle Real 70" at the New York International Independent Film and Video Festival; Enrique Beltrán, prosecutor at the Tribunal Superior de Justicia de Valencia; Susana Sanz who was reelected as expert of the European Commission for the LifeLong Learning Programme.

The university has some notarial honoris causa:

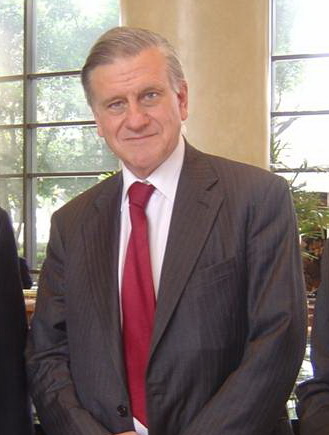
Valentín Fuster in New York City, 2012

- Valentín Fuster is a Spanish cardiologist – the only cardiologist to receive the two highest gold medal awards and all four major research awards from the world's four major cardiovascular organizations: The Distinguished Researcher Award (Interamerican Society of Cardiology, 2005 and 2009), Andreas Gruntzig Scientific Award and Gold Medal Award (European Society of Cardiology, 1992-2007 respectively), Gold Medal Award and Distinguished Scientist (American Heart Association, 2001 and 2003 respectively), and the Distinguished Scientist Award (American College of Cardiology, 1993). Fuster made news in 2006 when he managed a patient who underwent successful combined heart and lung transplant, which New York Magazine named one of the year's "11 medical marvels". In November 2012, Dr. Fuster received the highest honor given by the American Heart Association, the Research Achievement Award. Dr. Fuster has ranked among the Top Doctors in the US for the past 13 years and is considered in the top 1% of physicians in the United States by Castle-Connolly.
- Jose Maria Aznar (Spanish pronunciation: [xoˈse maˈɾia aθˈnaɾ]; born 25 February 1953) served as the Prime Minister of Spain from 1996 to 2004. He is on the board of directors of News Corporation and is also a member of the Club de Madrid.
- Antonio Cañizares Llovera (born 15 October 1945) is a Spanish Cardinal of the Roman Catholic Church who is the current Prefect of the Congregation for Divine Worship and the Discipline of the Sacraments, having previously served as Archbishop of Toledo and Primate of Spain from 2002 to 2008. Pope Benedict XVI created him Cardinal-Priest of San Pancrazio in the consistory of 24 March 2006. The Spanish primate was awarded a doctorate honoris causa from the Universidad CEU Cardenal Herrera on that same date. He will be eligible to participate in any future papal conclaves until he reaches the age of eighty on 10 October 2025

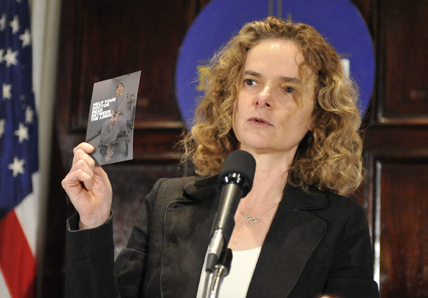
Nora Volkow in 2009, she is director of the National Institute on Drug Abuse (NIDA).

- Nora Volkow (b. 27 March 1956 Mexico) is director of the National Institute on Drug Abuse (NIDA). She is the great-granddaughter of Russian revolutionary leader and Head of the Fourth International, Leon Trotsky. She attended the Modern American School, then earned a medical degree from National University of Mexico before going to New York University for psychiatric residency. She chose a career in brain research after reading an article on the use of positron emission tomography in studying brain function. She did research at Brookhaven National Laboratory before becoming director of NIDA in 2003.
- Joaquín Navarro-Valls, M.D. (born 16 November 1936, Cartagena, Spain), studied medicine at the Universities of Granada and Barcelona, as well as journalism at the Faculty of Sciences of Communication at the University of Navarra in Pamplona, Spain. He also took post-graduate studies at Harvard University in the United States. He graduated summa cum laude in Medicine and Surgery in 1961 and took courses for a doctorate in Psychiatry in "Trastornos psiquiátricos en los traumas craneales". In addition, he taught at the Faculty of Medicine. In 1968, received a degree in journalism and in the science of communication in 1980. In 1988, he received the Ischia International Journalism Award. He was the Director of the Holy See Press Office (or Vatican Press Office), taking the post in 1984. His role as the press liaison between the Vatican and the world press corps gave him perhaps the highest visibility of any one person in the Vatican during the long reign of Pope John Paul II, with the exception of the Pope himself. Navarro-Valls, a non-clerical journalist, resigned his post 11 July 2006. Pope Benedict XVI has appointed the Reverend Father Federico Lombardi, S.J., to take his place. On 20 January 2007, it was announced that he will be president of the board of advisers of the Biomedical University of Rome. In 2007, he was awarded the Commander's Cross with Star Order of Merit of the Republic of Poland by the President of Poland.

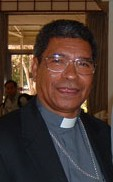
Bishop Carlos Belo, Nobel Peace Prize, in 1996

- Bishop Carlos Belo SDB, GCL (born 3 February 1948) is an East Timorese Roman Catholic bishop. Along with José Ramos-Horta, he received the 1996 Nobel Peace Prize for work "towards a just and peaceful solution to the conflict in East Timor". Bishop Belo's labours on behalf of the East Timorese and in pursuit of peace and reconciliation were internationally recognised when, along with José Ramos-Horta, he was awarded the Nobel Peace Prize in December 1996. Bishop Belo capitalised upon this honour through meetings with Bill Clinton of the United States and Nelson Mandela of South Africa. In 1995, he also won the John Humphrey Freedom Award from the Canadian human rights group Rights & Democracy. In July 2004, Bishop Belo took up missionary work in Maputo, the capital of Mozambique and this year was awarded an honorary doctorate from CEU Cardenal Herrera University
- Stanley G. Payne (born September 9, 1934, in Denton, Texas) is a historian of modern Spain and European Fascism at the University of Wisconsin–Madison. He retired from full-time teaching in 2004 and is currently Professor Emeritus at its Department of History. Payne uses a lengthy itemized list of characteristics to identify fascism, including the creation of an authoritarian state; a regulated, state-integrated economic sector; fascist symbolism; anti-liberalism; anti-communism, and anti-conservatism. He sees elimination of the autonomy or, in some cases, complete existence of large-scale capitalism as the common aim of all fascist movements.
- Andrea Riccardi (born 1950 in Rome) is the founder of the Community of Sant'Egidio and Professor of Contemporary History at the University of Rome III in Rome, Italy. Since November 16, 2011, he has served as Minister for International Cooperation without portfolio in the Monti Cabinet. Riccardi is also a member of the Fondation Chirac's honour committee, ever since the foundation was launched in 2008 by former French president Jacques Chirac in order to promote world peace. He also participated as jury member in 2009 for the Prize for Conflict Prevention awarded every year by this foundation.

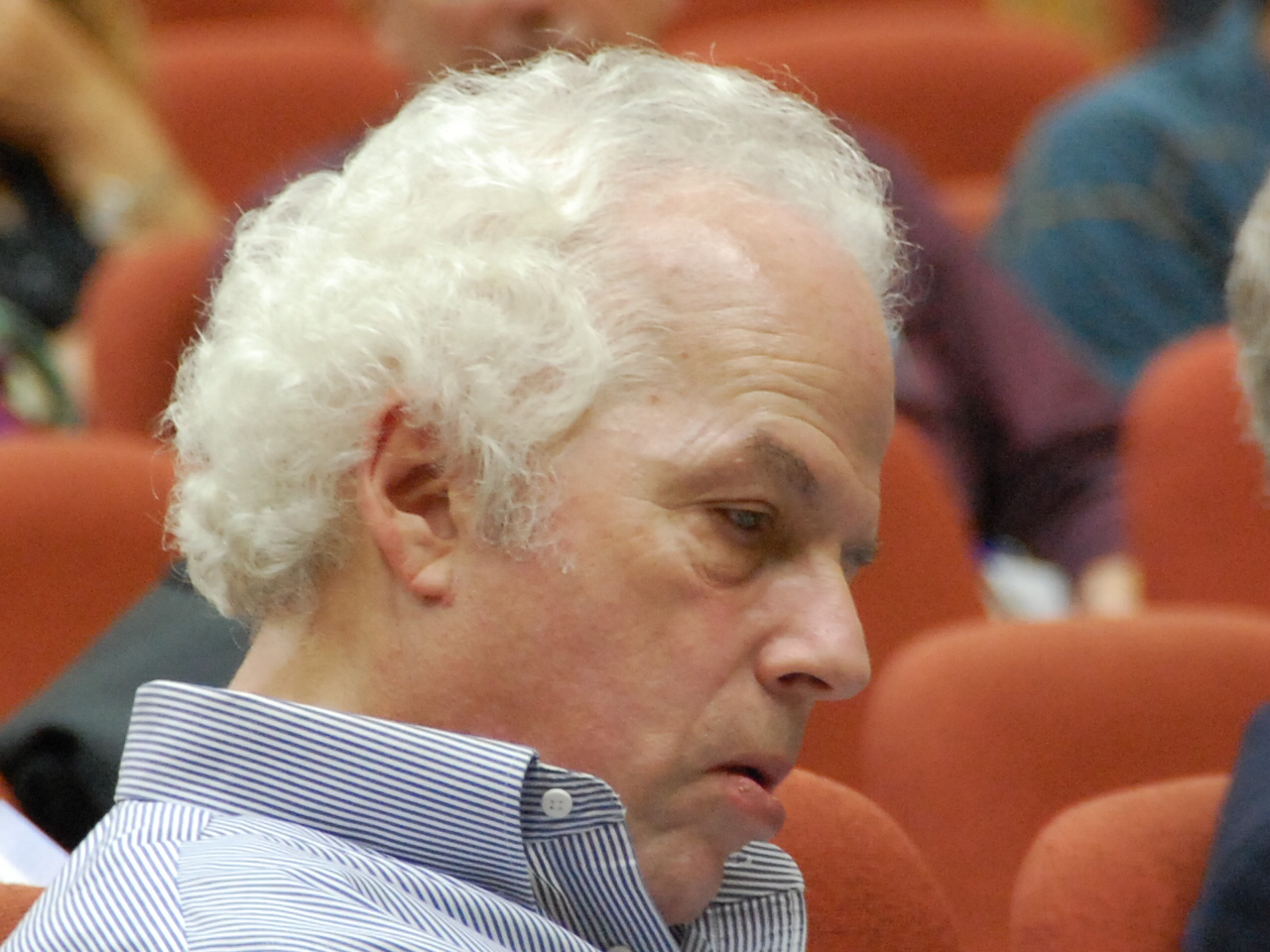
Stanley B. Prusiner, Nobel Prize in Physiology or Medicine, in 2007

- Stanley B. Prusiner (born 28 May 1942) is an American neurologist and biochemist. Currently the director of the Institute for Neurodegenerative Diseases at University of California, San Francisco (UCSF). Prusiner received a Bachelor of Science degree in chemistry from the University of Pennsylvania and later received his M.D. from the University of Pennsylvania School of Medicine. Prusiner then completed an internship in medicine at the University of California, San Francisco. Later Prusiner moved to the National Institutes of Health, where he studied glutaminases in E. coli in the laboratory of Earl Stadtman. He received the Albert Lasker Award for Basic Medical Research in 1994 and the Nobel Prize in Physiology or Medicine in 1997 for his work in proposing an explanation for the cause of bovine spongiform encephalopathy ("mad cow disease") and its human equivalent, Creutzfeldt–Jakob disease. In this work, he coined the term prion, which comes from the words "proteinaceous" and "infectious", to refer to a previously undescribed form of infection due to protein misfolding. Prusiner was elected to the National Academy of Science in 1992 and to its governing council in 2007. He is also an elected member of the American Academy of Arts and Sciences (1993), the Royal Society (1996), the American Philosophical Society (1998), the Serbian Academy of Sciences and Arts (2003), and the Institute of Medicine.
