= Federico Martínez Roda =

Federico Martínez Roda is a professor of history at the Valencia Catholic University.

Federico Martínez (Requena 1950) studied philosophy and literature and law at the University of Valencia, where he received his PhD in history in 1979 for extensive and innovative research on the Port of Valencia. He furthered his studies in Brussels and Geneva.

His research began in 1973 with his thesis about Valencian illustration. Since then, he has focused in five lines of research: Valencia, historical methodology, globalization, international relations, and military issues.

Martínez began his teaching career as secondary school teacher, becoming a high school headmaster in Mislata and Utiel (1975–1983). He later served as C.A.P. coordinator in geography and history for the University of Valencia, secretary general of the Universidad CEU Cardenal Herrera from 2001 to 2008, and vice chancellor of the CEU San Pablo University from 2011 to 2013.

He joined Valencia Catholic University in September 2014 and is currently a professor at the university. As a university professor, he has been invited to the universities of Kraków, Wroclaw, Lima, King's Point (New York), Managua, St. Pölten, Wisconsin, and Nova de Lisboa.

Martínez has been the editor of Annals, the scientific magazine published by the Real Academia de Cultura Valenciana, since 2008.

In 2015, he was awarded the XVII Ángel Herrera Prize in recognition for his work.

== Books and publications ==
1. "Notas sobre la agricultura española". La Semana Vitivinícola. Revista Técnica. nº 1.502, Valencia, 1975. Depósito Legal: V. 181-1958
2. Requena. Notas de Geografía Activa. Editorial Semana Gráfica, Valencia, 1976. Depósito Legal V-393-1976
3. Utiel: la tierra y los hombres. Ayuntamiento de Utiel. Utiel. 1978. ISBN 84-500-2687-3
4. "El tráfico de pasajeros entre los puertos de Palma de Mallorca y Alicante". Actas del VI Coloquio de Geografía. Universidad de Palma de Mallorca. 1979 (En colaboración con A. Diéguez). ISBN 84-300-8327-8
5. El puerto de Valencia. Universidad de Valencia. Valencia. 1980. ISBN 84-370-0126-9
6. "Los ilustrados valencianos y la economía". Saitabi, nº 30, Universidad de Valencia, 1980. Depósito Legal V-2.147-1960
7. Orientaciones metodológicas para el estudio geográfico de los puertos españoles. Consell del País Valencià. Valencia. 1981. Depósito Legal V-1319-1981
8. "La ordenación del territorio y el espacio rural en ámbitos regionales". Actas del VII Coloquio de Geografía. Universidad de Navarra. Pamplona, 1981. Depósito Legal S−342-1983
9. "Las industrias agropecuarias en España". Dianium. U.N.E.D. Denia, 1982. Depósito Legal A-790-1982
10. Nuestra tierra, nuestra gente. Ayuntamiento de Requena. Requena. 1982. ISBN 84-500-7987-X
11. "Bunyola, de zona deprimida a barrio dormitorio y de segunda residencia". Actas del VIII Coloquio de Geografía, Universidad de Barcelona, 1983 (En colaboración con A. Diéguez). Depósito Legal B-29.546–1983.
12. El comercio internacional y los transportes. Editorial Cincel. Madrid.1983. Reimpreso en 1985, 1988 y 1990. ISBN 84-7046-313-6
13. "L' Ensemble portuaire de Lorient". Norois, nº 119, Université de Poitiers (CNRS) 1983. ISSN 0029-182X
14. "El puerto de Valencia, sus funciones, tráfico e hinterland". Conferencias sobre temas marítimos, Cámara Oficial de Comercio, Valencia, 1983. Depósito Legal V-2539-1983
15. La Comunidad Valenciana. Editorial SM, Madrid, 1984. ISBN 84-348-1396-3
16. "Los recursos forestales en España y su industrialización". Dianium. U.N.E.D. Denia, 1984. Depósito Legal A-790-1982
17. "Los vinos valencianos" Primer Congrés d' Economía Valenciana. Generalidad Valenciana, Valencia, 1984. (En colaboración con Fernando Martínez Roda). ISBN 84-7579-045-3
18. Prácticas de Geografía Humana y Económica. Editorial ECIR, Valencia, 1984. (Como integrante del grupo de investigación didáctica Edetania, del ICE de la Universidad de Valencia, constituido por 9 miembros). OCLC 434645600
19. Geografía Humana y Económica. Editorial ECIR, Valencia,1985 (Grupo Edetania) ISBN 84-7065-107-2
20. Historia del Mundo Contemporáneo. Editorial ECIR. Valencia, 1986 (Grupo Edetania). ISBN 84-7065-113-7
21. Geografía e Historia de España. Editorial ECIR. Valencia, 1987 (Grupo Edetania). ISBN 84-7065-122-6
22. Historia de las Civilizaciones y del Arte. Editorial ECIR. Valencia. 1988 (Grupo Edetania) ISBN 84-7065-141-2
23. Història General de les Civilitzations y del Art. Editorial ECIR, Valencia, 1989 (Grupo Edetania). ISBN 84-7065-151-X
24. Formación Humanística. Editorial ECIR, Valencia, 1989. (Grupo Edetania). ISBN 84-7065-146-3
25. Geografía e Historia de España. Editorial ECIR, Valencia, 1990 ( Grupo Edetania). ISBN 84-7065-154-4
26. "Los puertos valencianos. Evolución histórica y situación actual". Serie Histórica, nº 5, Real Academia de Cultura Valenciana, Valencia, 1990. ISSN 0214-025X
27. Historia Contemporánea de la Comunidad Valenciana. Fundación Universitaria San Pablo CEU, Valencia, 1990.(En colaboración con J. Salom). ISBN 978-84-404-7142-0
28. "Historia, realidad y educación en el pensamiento de Ortega y Gasset". Revista Comunicación y Estudios Universitarios. CEU San Pablo, Valencia, 1990. ISBN 84-600-7604-0
29. Actas del II Congreso de Jóvenes Historiadores y Geógrafos. Consejo Superior de Investigaciones Científicas. Valencia, 1993, 2 volúmenes (En calidad de editor) – "Notas sobre la cientificidad de la Historia". Actas del II Congreso de Jóvenes Historiadores y Geógrafos. C.S.I.C. Valencia, 1993. ISBN 84-00-04860-1
30. "La influencia de la inhibición administrativa en la selección del profesorado universitario" II Encuentro Internacional de Universidades Privadas. Fundación Universitaria San Pablo CEU, Madrid, 1993. ISBN 84-86792-22-3
31. "La influencia de la inhibición administrativa en la selección del profesorado universitario". Cátedra Nova, nº 2 Badajoz, 1995. ISSN 1135-2981
32. Síntesis de Historia del Pensamiento Político .Editorial Actas. Madrid, 1994 (En colaboración con Sáenz-Díez y García Fraile). ISBN 84-87863-28-0
33. "Las formas de pensamiento: algunas corrientes de la filosofía contemporánea". Capítulo 6 de Historia del Mundo Contemporáneo, Editorial Actas, Madrid, 1994. ISBN 84-87863-29-9
34. "La programación infantil de televisión y los valores éticos: la conducta prosocial" Comunicación y Estudios Universitarios nº 4. CEU San Pablo, Valencia, 1994 (En colaboración con E. Israel y E. García de Torres). ISBN 84-86792-27-4
35. "Majorités politiques et fonctionnement de l´aire métropolitaine de Valence". Capítulo 19 de Metropolisation et Politique, Éditions L´Harmattan, Paris, 1997. ISBN 2-7384-5622-7
36. Valencia y las Valencias: su historia contemporánea. Fundación Universitaria San Pablo CEU, Valencia, 1998. ISBN 84-86792-89-4
37. "El 98 y la crisis del sistema político de la Restauración (1898–1914)", Cátedra Nova, nº 7, Badajoz, 1999. ISSN 1135-2981
38. "Tratamiento periodístico del asesinato de Cánovas en la prensa valenciana" en Cánovas y su época, Colección Veintiuno, Madrid, 1999 (En colaboración con E. García de Torres). ISBN 84-88306-55-5
39. "Derecho, Moral y Economía en la Ilustración valenciana". Serie Filológica nº 21, Real Academia de Cultura Valenciana, Valencia, 2000. ISSN 0213-9723
40. Historia de Lo Rat Penat. Edición institucional. Valencia, 2000 (Director de la obra) -"Lo Rat Penat i l´imaginari colectiu valencià". Capítulo 11 de Historia de Lo Rat Penat. Valencia, 2000. ISBN 84-89069-57-3
41. "Un pequeño combate por la historia oral", Calendura nº 4, Universidad CEU Cardenal Herrera, Elche, 2001. ISSN 1575-233X
42. Marqués de Campo. Colección personajes del Milenio. Editor F. Doménech S.A., Valencia, 2002.
43. "Edad Contemporánea" Parte Quinta de Historia General del Reino de Valencia, Real Academia de Cultura Valenciana, Valencia, 2002. ISSN 0214-025X
44. La Valencia contemporánea. Real Academia de Cultura Valenciana, Valencia, 2003. ISBN 84-96068-37-4
45. Cambio y permanencia en la beneficencia valenciana. Universidad CEU Cardenal Herrera, Valencia, 2004. ISBN 84-96144-19-4
46. "Cambios socio-económicos en la Valencia del siglo XX". Serie Histórica de la Real Academia de Cultura Valenciana, nº 26, Valencia, 2004. ISSN 0214-025X
47. De Feria Muestrario a Feria Valencia. Ed. Oronella, Valencia, 2005. (En colaboración con D. Sala). ISBN 84-89737-08-8
48. "The Globalization and its perception". Globalized Europe. Univerza na Primorskem, Koper, 2005. ISBN 961-6033-68-9
49. "Las Cortes Valencianas democráticas". Parte Cuarta de Corts Valencianes. Edición Institucional, Valencia, 2005. ISBN 978-84-89684-18-8
50. "Los cambios de las formas jurídicas en la gestión sanitaria y su significación histórica" Capítulo 5 de Acción sanitaria y cambio social. Ed. Oronella, Valencia, 2005. ISBN 84-89737-04-5
51. "Los cambios de las formas jurídicas en la gestión sanitaria y su significación histórica" reeditado en la obra Modelo Alzira (1999–2005). Conselleria de Sanidad, Generalitat Valenciana, 2006. Depósito Legal V-4102-2006
52. "Los cambios de la formas jurídicas en la gestión sanitaria y su significación histórica" de nuevo reeditado en la obra Las nuevas formas de gestión sanitaria: Modelo Alzira. Instituto de Estudios Económicos, Madrid, 2007. ISBN 978-84-88533-93-7
53. La Real Academia de la Cultura Valenciana en su nonagésimo aniversario. Edición Institucional, Valencia, 2006. ISBN 84-96068-81-1
54. "La OTAN y la defensa de Europa". La Imagen de las Fuerzas Armadas, Hermandad de Veteranos de las Fuerzas Armadas, Madrid, 2007. ISBN 978-84-611-9619-7
55. Diez años de reflexión sobre el nacionalismo, el estado, la nación, la soberanía y lo hispánico. Tirant lo Blanch, Valencia, 2007. (Coautor de esta obra colectiva de 26 partícipes). ISBN 978-84-8456-283-2
56. "Valencia, 1808. Militares y paisanos", II Muestra de Audiovisual Histórico de Segorbe. Sociedad Estatal de Conmemoraciones Culturales, Segorbe, 2008.
57. "España en un mundo globalizado y multipolar", La estrategia, Hermandad de Veteranos de las Fuerzas Armadas, Madrid, 2008. ISBN 978-84-691-2483-3
58. "Destrucción y reconstrucción del Puerto de Valencia (1936–1942)". La República y la Guerra Civil, setenta años después. Actas. Madrid, 2008. ISBN 978-84-96068-07-0
59. "Noticia de una emisora peculiar: Radio Requena, la voz de la Fiesta de la Vendimia (1951–1953), OLEANA, nº 23, Requena, 2008. ISSN 1139-4943
60. Historia del Mundo Contemporáneo. De la revolución a la globalización. Tirant lo Blanch, Valencia, 2008. (Director de la obra). – "Los totalitarismos" Capítulos 4 y 5. Historia del Mundo Contemporáneo. De la revolución a la globalización. Tirant lo Blanch. Valencia, 2008. ISBN 978-84-9876-277-8 (de la 1ª edición). ISBN 978-84-9876-781-0 (de la 2ª edición, en 2010)
61. Actas del Congreso Internacional sobre la Guerra de la Independencia y los cambios institucionales. Diputación de Valencia, 2009. (Editor de la obra) -"Guerra de la Independencia e Historia contemporánea". Actas del Congreso Internacional de la Guerra de la Independencia y los cambios institucionales. Diputación de Valencia, 2009. ISBN 978-84- 96068-07-0
62. "El Sexenio Revolucionario (1868–1874)". Capítulo 13 de Historia de España Contemporánea, Ed. Sello, Barcelona, 2009. ISBN 978-84-937381-0-5 (rústica) ISBN 978-84-937381-3-6 (tapas duras)
63. "El Sexenio Revolucionario (1868–1874)". Capítulo 13 de Historia de España Contemporánea, Ed. Ariel-Planeta, Barcelona, 2010. (2ª Edición). ISBN 978-84-344-6931-0
64. Catálogo de la Exposición Regional Valenciana de 1909 en su centenario, Real Academia de Cultura Valenciana, Valencia. 2009. (Comisario de la Exposición y coautor de los textos). ISBN 978-84-96068-11-7
65. "Sí, es posible el estudio del pasado reciente" en Historiografía Global (Tomo III), Historia a Debate, Santiago de Compostela, 2009. ISBN 84-931576-4-3
66. El "think tank" del valencianisme, Lo Rat Penat, Valencia, 2010. ISBN 978-84-89069-73-2
67. "España ante los retos de Seguridad y Defensa del siglo XXI". Fuerzas Armadas Españolas: del presente al futuro. Hermandad de Veteranos de la Fuerzas Armadas. Madrid. 2010.
68. "Grandes temas económicos de la Ilustración española", OLEANA nº 24, Requena, 2010. ISSN 1139-4943
69. Levantamiento popular y convocatoria a Cortes. Castellón 1810. Asociación Cultural Gregal, Castellón de la Plana, 2011. Coordinador de la obra - "La Historia Contemporánea (disciplina) en la Historia Contemporánea (periodo)" Levantamiento popular y convocatoria a Cortes. Castellón 1810. Asociación Cultural Gregal, Castellón de la Plana, 2011. ISBN 978-84-694-2857-3
70. La división provincial y el final del Reino de Valencia (1810–1833). Real Academia de Cultura Valenciana, Valencia, 2011. ISBN 978-84-96068-25-4
71. Reconstruir después de una guerra. Diputación de Castellón, Castellón de la Plana, 2012. Coordinador de la obra. - "El difícil entorno exterior durante la Reconstrucción Española (1939–1951)". Reconstruir después de una guerra. Diputación de Castellón, Diputación de Castellón, Castellón de la Plana, 2012. ISBN 978-84-15301-10-3
72. Varela. El general antifascista de Franco, La Esfera de los Libros, Madrid, 2012. ISBN 978-84-9970-300-8
73. "Régimen de jornada, permisos, licencias y vacaciones" en Comentarios a la Ley de la Función Pública Valenciana, Tirant lo Blanch, Valencia, 2012. ISBN 978-84-9033-317-4
74. "El contexto histórico de la Constitución de 1812". Serie Histórica de la Real Academia de Cultura Valenciana, nº 33, Valencia, 2013. ISSN 0214-025X
75. "Visión de la Transición Española a la democracia, una generación después", Anales de la Real Academia de Cultura Valenciana, nº 88, Valencia, 2013. ISSN 1130-426X
76. "La Península Ibérica, Europa y la modernidad". Espacio, Tiempo y Forma, Serie V, nº 25, UNED, Madrid, 2013. ISSN 1130-0124
77. "El Derecho común y la supresión de los fueros de Valencia", Revista de Estudios Políticos, nº 163, Enero-marzo 2014. ISSN 0048-7694
78. División Provincial: origen y consecuencias. Asociación Gregal. Castellón de la Plana. 2014. Coordinador de la obra. - "El surgimiento de las provincias y sus diputaciones (1810–1836)". División Provincial: origen y consecuencias. Asociación Gregal. Castellón de la Plana, 2014
79. Carlismo: Ideas y práctica política. Diputación Provincial de Castellón. Castellón de la Plana. 2015. Coordinador de la obra. 264 páginas. - "Siglo y medio de carlismo entre la obstinación y la división (1830-1980). Carlismo: Ideas y práctica política. Diputación Provincial de Castellón. Castellón de la Plana. 2015. Págs. 231-264. ISBN 978-84-606-7376-7
80. "Memoria y realidad histórica de la batalla de Almansa y de la supresión de los fueros de Valencia". Memoria de la guerra de sucesión y del Tratado de Utrecht. CEU Ediciones, Madrid, 2015. Págs. 115-130. ISBN 978-84-15949-99-2
