= José M. de Areilza =

Spanish Professor and Jean Monnet Chair

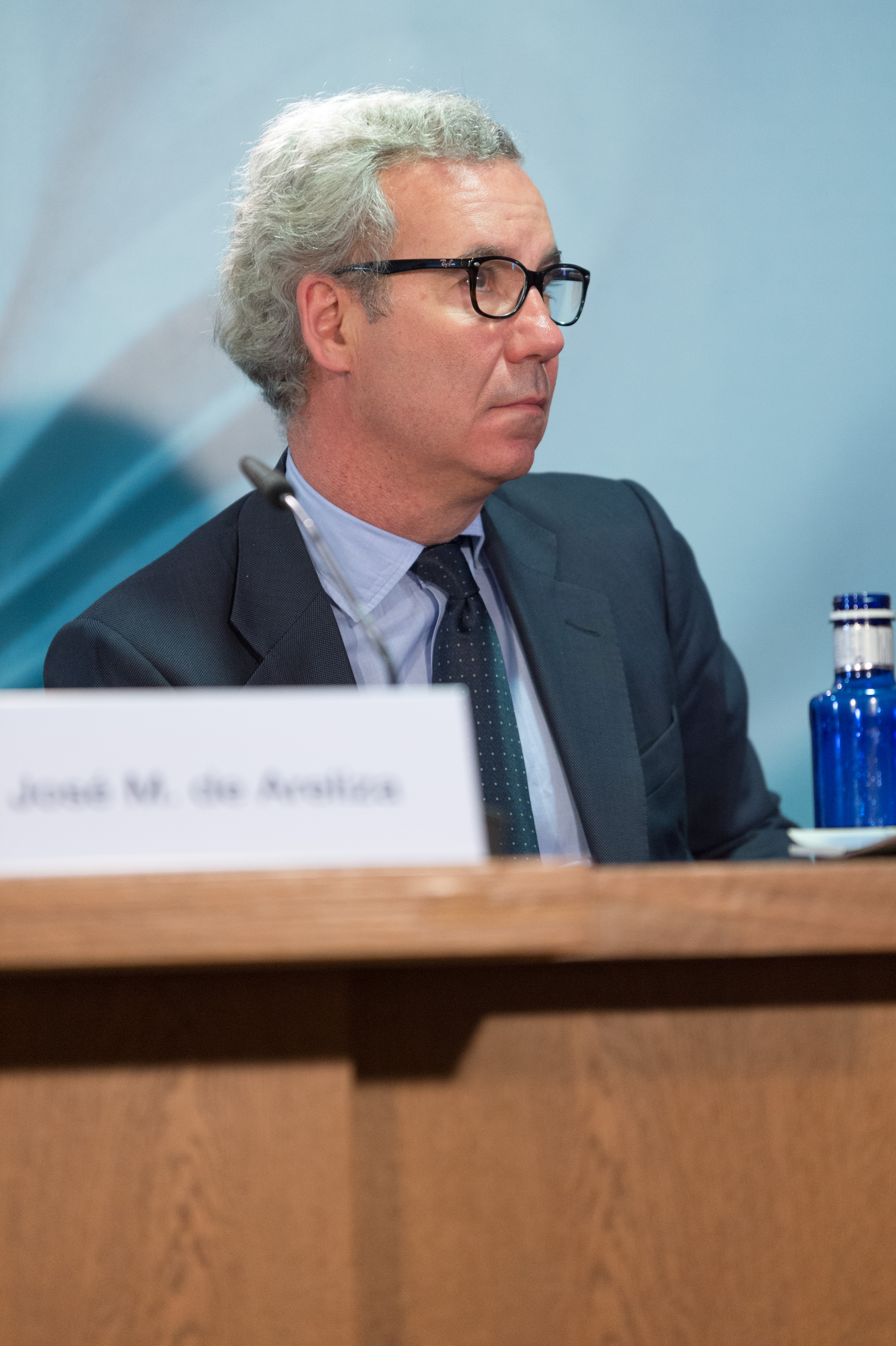
- Born: 1966; Madrid
- Alma mater: Harvard University; Complutense University of Madrid

José María de Areilza Carvajal (born in Madrid in 1966), 4th Count of Rodas and 6th Count of Motrico, is a Spanish Professor and Jean Monnet Chair at ESADE Business School, Ramón Llull University, Barcelona and Madrid and Secretary General of Aspen Institute España foundation, partner of The Aspen Institute in the USA.

He holds doctorate in Law (S.J.D.) from Harvard University and is the author of works relating to the institutions of the European Union and the allocation of powers between the Union and Member States. He writes a weekly column on international affairs at ABC newspaper.

== Education ==
Born in 1966 in Madrid, he received a licentiate degree in Law with High Honors at Universidad Complutense de Madrid. He obtained a Master of Laws (LL.M) and a Doctorate in Juridical Sciences (S.J.D.) from Harvard Law School, where he worked with Professors Joseph Weiler and David Kennedy and was a Fulbright Scholar. He also received a Master of International Relations (M.A.) from The Fletcher School of Law and Diplomacy, Tufts University. In 1992 he was admitted to the New York Bar.

== Career ==
José M. de Areilza begun his academic career at Universidad San Pablo CEU, Madrid, where he taught European Union Law between 1994 and 1996. That year, he was appointed Advisor on European and North American affairs at the Spanish Prime Minister's Office, where he worked with Prime Minister José María Aznar for four years.

In 2000 he became Director of Legal Studies at Instituto de Empresa (IE) Business School. In 2002, he was appointed Vice Dean of IE Business School and, in 2008, first Dean of the new IE Law School. The European Commission awarded him a Jean Monnet Chair in 2007, and in 2009, he became President of the IE University-Jean Monnet Center for European Studies.

In April 2012 he became Secretary General of Aspen Institute España, partner of The Aspen Institute in the USA, www.aspeninstitute.es

In September 2012, he was appointed Professor of Law at ESADE Law School, Ramón Llul University, Barcelona, and Madrid. In 2013 he was elected Member of the European Council of Foreign Relations (ecfr.eu) and was granted a Jean Monnet Chair-ESADE by the European Commission. That year, he was appointed Senior Research Fellow at the Real Instituto Elcano.

He serves as Co-Chairman of the British-Spanish Tertulias (the UK-Spain Forum), Academy Adjunct Faculty at Chatham House, London, and Jean Monnet Visiting Professor at William and Mary School of Law, Virginia.

In 2017 he was awarded the Antonio Fontán Political Journalism Prize and in 2020 the Aquí Europa-Vocento European Journalism Prize. Since 2016 he has a double appointment at ESADE, in the Department of Law and the Department of Strategy and General Management, where he teaches and researches on Power and Influence in Organizations.

During the courses 2018–19 and 2019–20, he was a visiting professor at INSEAD Business School, Fontainebleau, where he taught "Power and Politics" in the MBA program.

== Publications ==
José M. de Areilza has published over thirty five academic articles on European Union decision-making, institutional reform, allocation of powers between the EU and Member States, enhanced cooperation, regions in the EU and Spanish foreign policy. In 2014 he published the book (in Spanish) "Law and Power in the European Union", Civitas. He has been the editor of the books "España y las transformaciones de la Unión Europea" (1998) and, with Pablo Mayor, "Internet, una profecía" (Ariel, 2002).

- Areilza Carvajal, José María de (2014). Poder y Derecho en la Unión Europea. Cizur Menor: Civitas/Aranzadi.

== Family ==
José M. de Areilza is the son of Enrique de Areilza Churruca and Pilar Carvajal Urquijo, Counts of Motrico. He is a grandson of the Spanish politician José María de Areilza. He is married to María Salgado Madriñán. They have two sons, Blanca and Santiago.

Ancestors of José María de Areilza Carvajal

8. Enrique Areilza y Arregui
4. José María de Areilza y Martínez de Rodas
9. Eloísa Emilia Martínez Arana
2. Enrique de Areilza y Churruca
10. José de Churruca y Calbetón
5. Mercedes de Churruca y Zubiría
11. María de las Mercedes de Zubiría y Urízar
1. José María de Areilza Carvajal
12. Francisco de Carvajal Hurtado de Mendoza
6. Francisco de Borja de Carvajal y Xifré
13. María del Dulce Nombre de Xifré y Chacón
3. Pilar Carvajal Urquijo
14. Estanislao de Urquijo y Ussía
7. María Isabel de Urquijo y Landeche
15. María del Pilar Landeche y Allendesalazar

== Community involvement ==
Member of the Board of Directors of ABC newspaper (2008–20), of Estudios de Política Exterior S.A., and of the Real Maestranza de Ronda.

Member of the Board of Directors of the Madrid Bar Association (2007–12)

Trustee of the Spanish Navy Museum and of Fundacion Museo ABC de Ilustración y Dibujo
