= Dalmacio Negro Pavón =

Spanish philosopher (1931–2024)

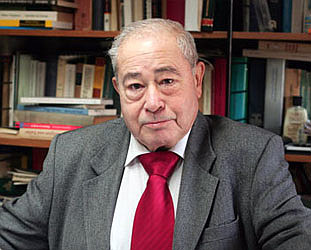
Dalmacio Negro Pavón in 2013

Dalmacio Negro Pavón (23 December 1931 – 23 December 2024) was a Spanish academic and author, who was a member of the Spanish Royal Academy of Moral and Social Sciences.

Negro Pavón was an attorney at law and held an MA in philosophy and a PhD in political science. Former positions include: associate professor of "Foundations in Philosophy", associate professor of "Philosophy in History" and professor of "History of ideas and Political Forms" at Universidad Complutense in Madrid, Spain.

He was emeritus professor of political science at CEU San Pablo University in Madrid (Spain) wherein he was actively engaged in the teaching of the degree in political science and public administration. He was also chairman of an advanced political science and history of ideas seminar that meets once a week.

Negro Pavón died on 23 December 2024, his 93rd birthday.

== Selected bibliography ==
A selected bibliography of Prof. Dalmacio Negro's books in Spanish (at the moment there are no English translations), sorted by year of first publication:

- 1976. Liberalismo y Socialismo: La encrucijada intelectual de Stuart Mill. Madrid: Centro de Estudios Políticos y Constitucionales. ISBN 978-84-259-0577-3.
- 1985. Compte: Positivismo y Revolución. Editorial Cincel. ISBN 978-84-7046-411-9.
- 1988. El Liberalismo en España. Unión Editorial, Madrid. ISBN 978-84-7209-209-9.
- 1995. Estudios sobre Carl Schmitt. Fundación Cánovas del Castillo, Madrid. ISBN 978-84-88306-26-5.
- 1995. La Tradición Liberal y el Estado. Unión Editorial, Madrid. ISBN 978-84-7209-287-7.
- 2002. Gobierno y Estado. Marcial Pons, Madrid. ISBN 978-84-7248-994-3.
- 2006. Lo que Europa debe al Cristianismo. Unión Editorial, Madrid. ISBN 978-84-7209-434-5.
- 2008. El Mito del Hombre Nuevo. Ediciones Encuentro, Madrid. ISBN 978-84-7490-961-6.
- 2010. Historia de las Formas del estado. Ediciones Encuentro, Madrid. ISBN 9788493778910.
