= Universidad CEU San Pablo =

Private Roman Catholic university in Madrid, Spain

CEU San Pablo University
- Universidad CEU San Pablo
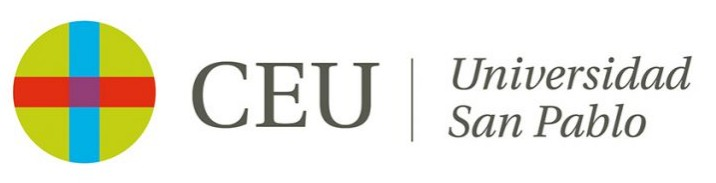
- Motto: In veritate libertas
- Motto in English: Freedom lies within the truth
- Type: Private
- Established: 1993
- Affiliations: Catholic
- Rector: Antonio Calvo Bernardino
- Faculty: 977 Professors
- Students: 10,000
- Location: Madrid, Spain; 40°26′34.7″N 3°42′58.8″W
- Campus: Urban
- Website: www.uspceu.com

CEU San Pablo University (Spanish: Universidad CEU San Pablo) is a private Catholic university located in Madrid, Spain, with campuses in Moncloa (Madrid) and in Montepríncipe (Alcorcón).

It is run by the Centro de Estudios Universitarios (CEU Foundation).

It was established in 1993 by the Catholic Association of Propagandists (Spanish: Asociación Católica de Propagandistas) with the goal of making positive changes in society through educational centres, which offer a model based on a holistic understanding of the human person and work in the public arena in defense of justice and human beings.

== History ==
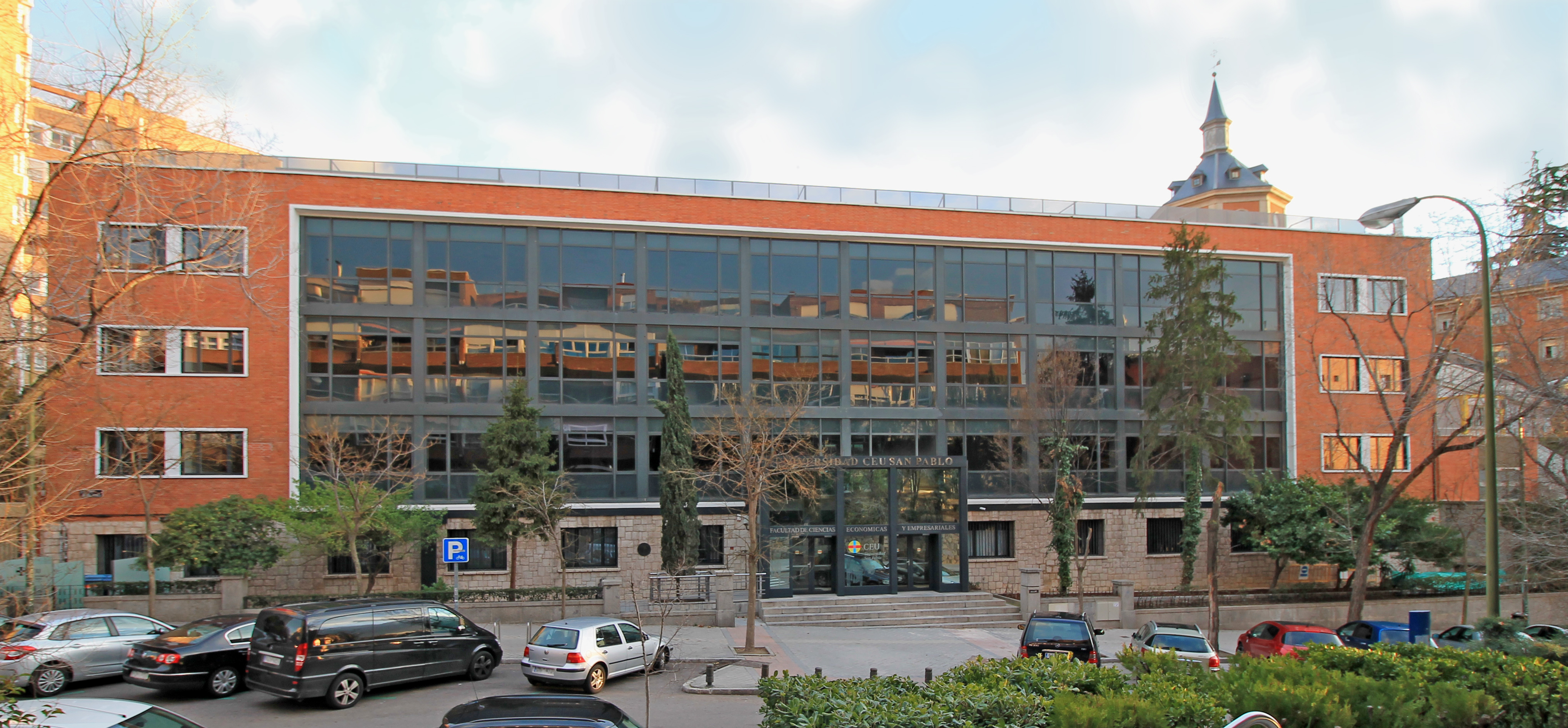
School of Economics and Business

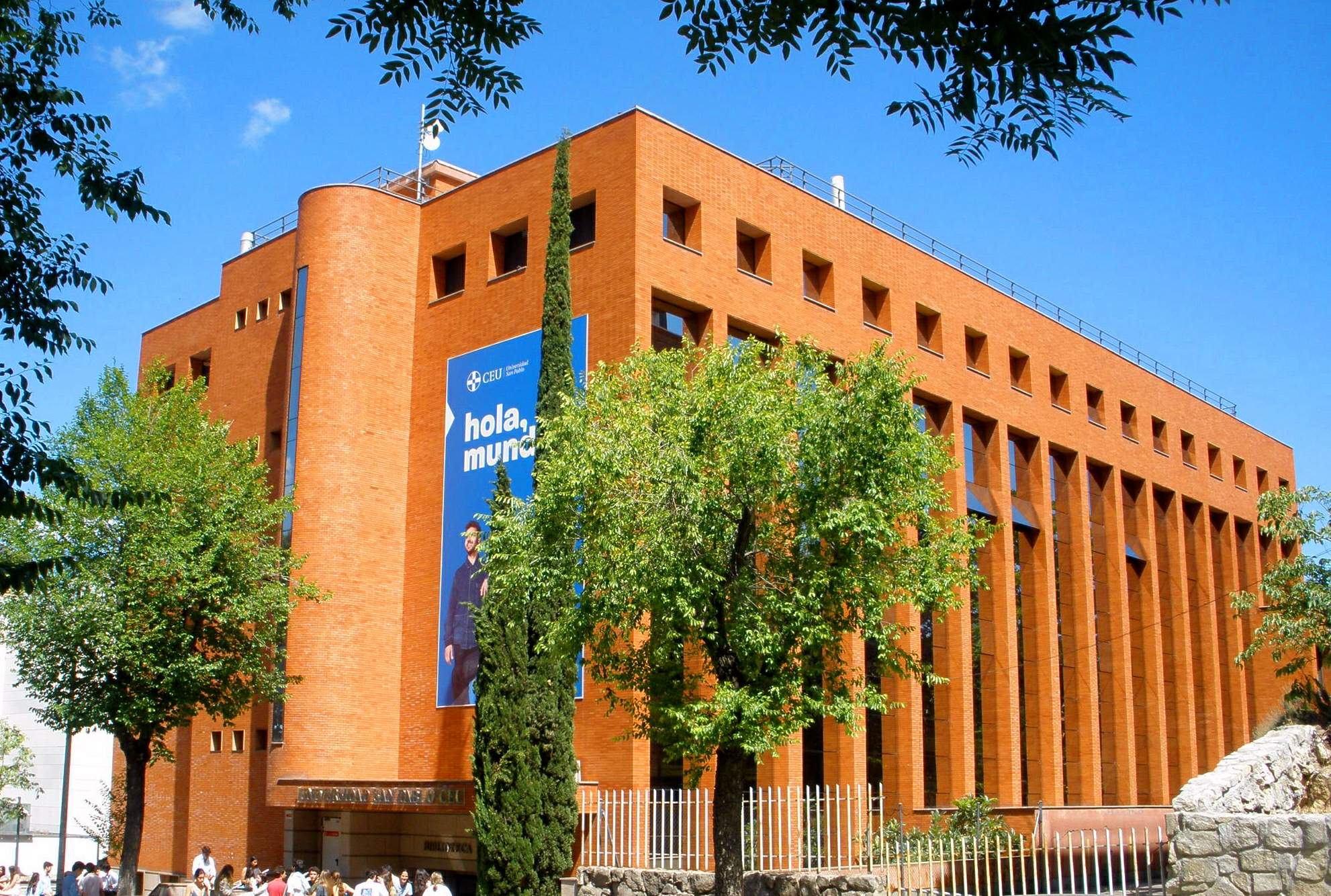
University Library

Until 1993, the CEU San Pablo University was attached to the public Complutense University of Madrid as a teaching center. It then requested its recognition by the Ministry of Education and Science, which after the mandatory report from the Council of Universities was approved by a law published on April 20, 1993. It currently has a totally private regime under Law 8/19934 and its owner is the San Pablo CEU University Foundation, which in turn is controlled by the Catholic Association of Propagandists.

The Kings of Spain officially inaugurated it on February 22, 1994.

== Organization ==
The University has six schools/faculties.

- School of Hummanities and Communication Sciences (Moncloa)
- Law School (Moncloa)
- School of Economics and Business (Moncloa)
- School of Pharmacy (Montepríncipe)
- School of Medicine (Montepríncipe)
- Institute of Technology (EPS) (Montepríncipe)

It also has more than 80 labs for teaching and research: the New Metabolomics and Bioanalysis Centre, MBEC (Nuevo Centro de Metabolómica y Bioanálisis, CEMBIO), the Agency (Agencia de comunicación), the producer CEU Media, and the Audiovisual Centre (Centro Audiovisual). Through Schools and institutes for the study of specific subject areas, the university is developing more than 78 research projects with external funding. Research institutes include:

- Real Instituto Universitario de Estudios Europeos
- Institute for The Study of Democracy
- CEU Institute for Family Studies
- Ángel Ayala CEU Institute for Humanities
- Metabolomics and Bioanalysis Excellence Centre (CEMBIO)
- Institute for Applied Molecular Medicine (IMMA)
- CEU Institute for Historical Studies
- Institute for the Study of Addiction (IEA-CEU)

In addition, the University runs a Polyclinic specialised in Dentistry, Physiotherapy, Psychology, Nutrition and Dietetics.

== International Relations and Rankings ==
CEU San Pablo University offers International Bilingual Programs, with Boston University, the University of Chicago, Fordham University and the University of California at Los Angeles that allow students to complete their studies at these universities. It is involved in a number of academic exchange programmes with renowned universities worldwide (Columbia, Chicago, Duke, Boston, Colgate), the Erasmus programme and international projects with over 200 higher education institutions in Europe, Latin America, North America and Asia.

CEU San Pablo (Madrid), CEU Cardenal Herrera (Valencia, Elche and Castellón) and Abat Oliba CEU (Barcelona), under the name of CEU Universities, ranked 6th among Spanish universities and among the top 500 universities worldwide in the 2021 Times Higher Education Ranking, where 1,527 university institutions from 93 countries participated. CEU has achieved an important recognition in the Times Higher Education 2023 ranking by being positioned as the first Spanish university in the area of 'Health and Well-being'.

Universidad CEU San Pablo is included in the top 3 of the Ranking of 50 careers published by the newspaper El Mundo supplement, which analyzes degree programs to guide students in university selection. In the 22nd edition, which includes 35 public and 11 private universities, two of its degrees are listed: Journalism and Human Nutrition and Dietetics. The publication also notes the 90th anniversary of Universidad CEU San Pablo and its focus on graduate employability, internationalization, digitization, and innovation.

Universidad CEU San Pablo is also ranking 5th in the 2022 ranking of the best private universities in Spain, according to FORBES.

== Colegio Mayor Universitario San Pablo ==
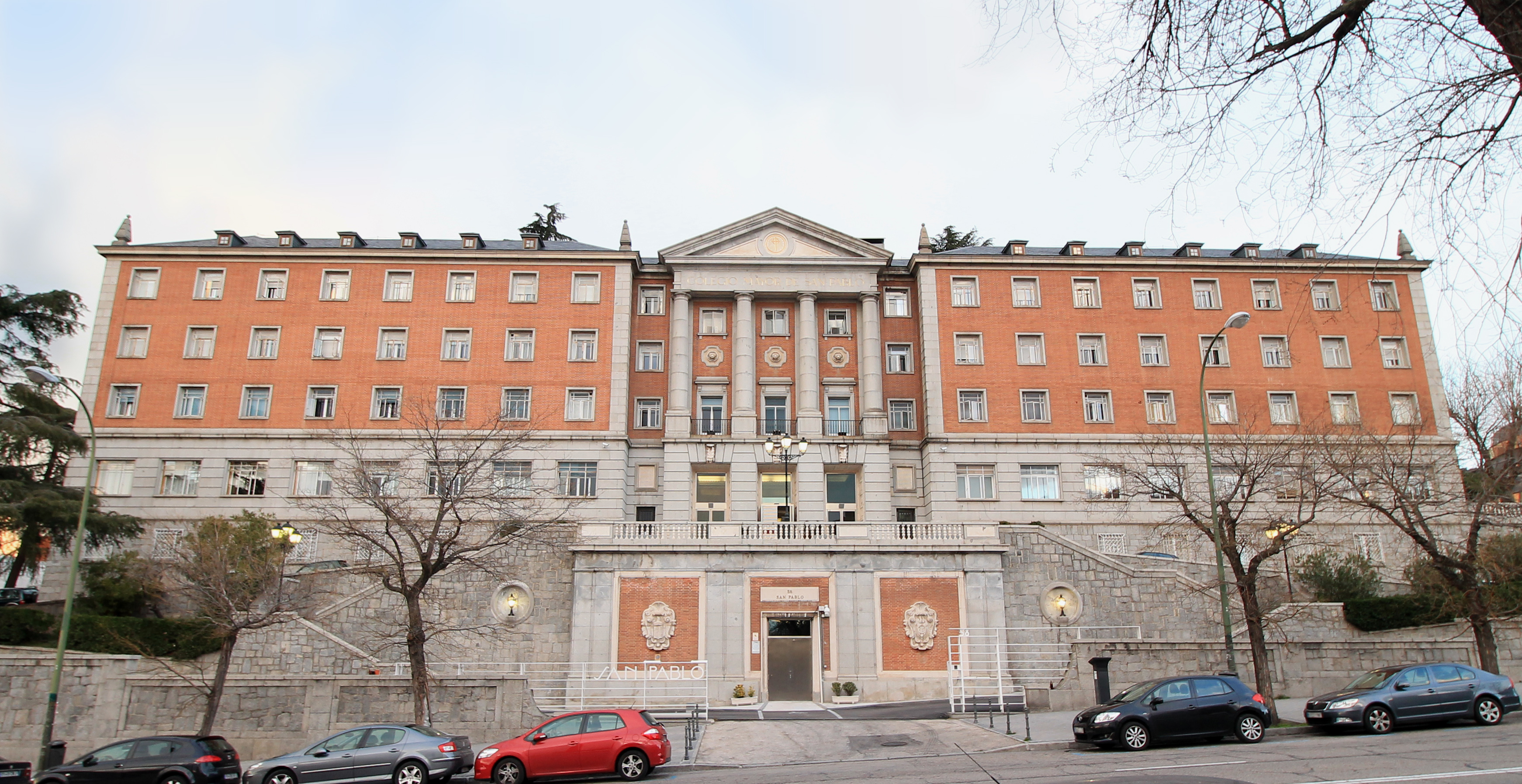
Colegio mayor (students residence) San Pablo CEU.

The San Pablo University Residence Hall is a residence hall located at 58 Isaac Peral Street in Madrid (Spain), very close to the CEU San Pablo University, to which it is attached. It was officially inaugurated on March 7, 1951; the works having begun with the laying of the first stone on October 12, 1945, in a ceremony officiated by Leopoldo Eijo Garay, Bishop of Madrid-Alcalá. The initial project was the work of the architect José María de la Vega Samper. It is designed in the neo-Herrerian style characteristic of the Francoist architecture.

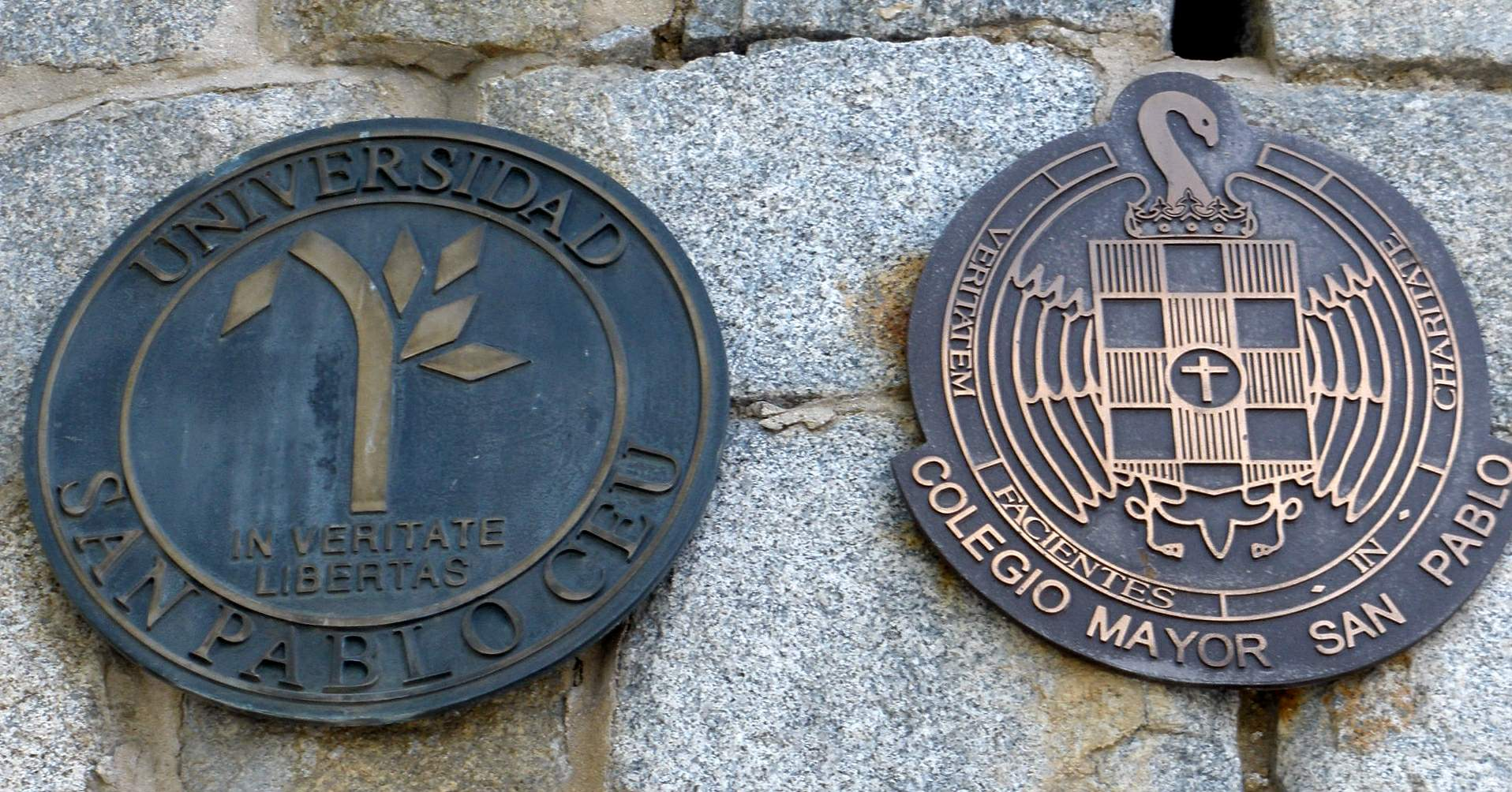
Commemorative plaque for the foundation of the Colegio Mayor

The colegio's ideology is graphically summarized in the motto, taken from the epistle of Saint Paul, which accompanies his shield: Veritatem facientes in caritate" (the truth is reached through charity). Since then, some 3,000 students have graduated from this University College, who call themselves "Paulinos".

== See also ==
- Dalmacio Negro Pavón
