= Pobles del Nord =

Valencian municipality, Spain

Pobles del Nord Poblats del Nord
- District of Valencia
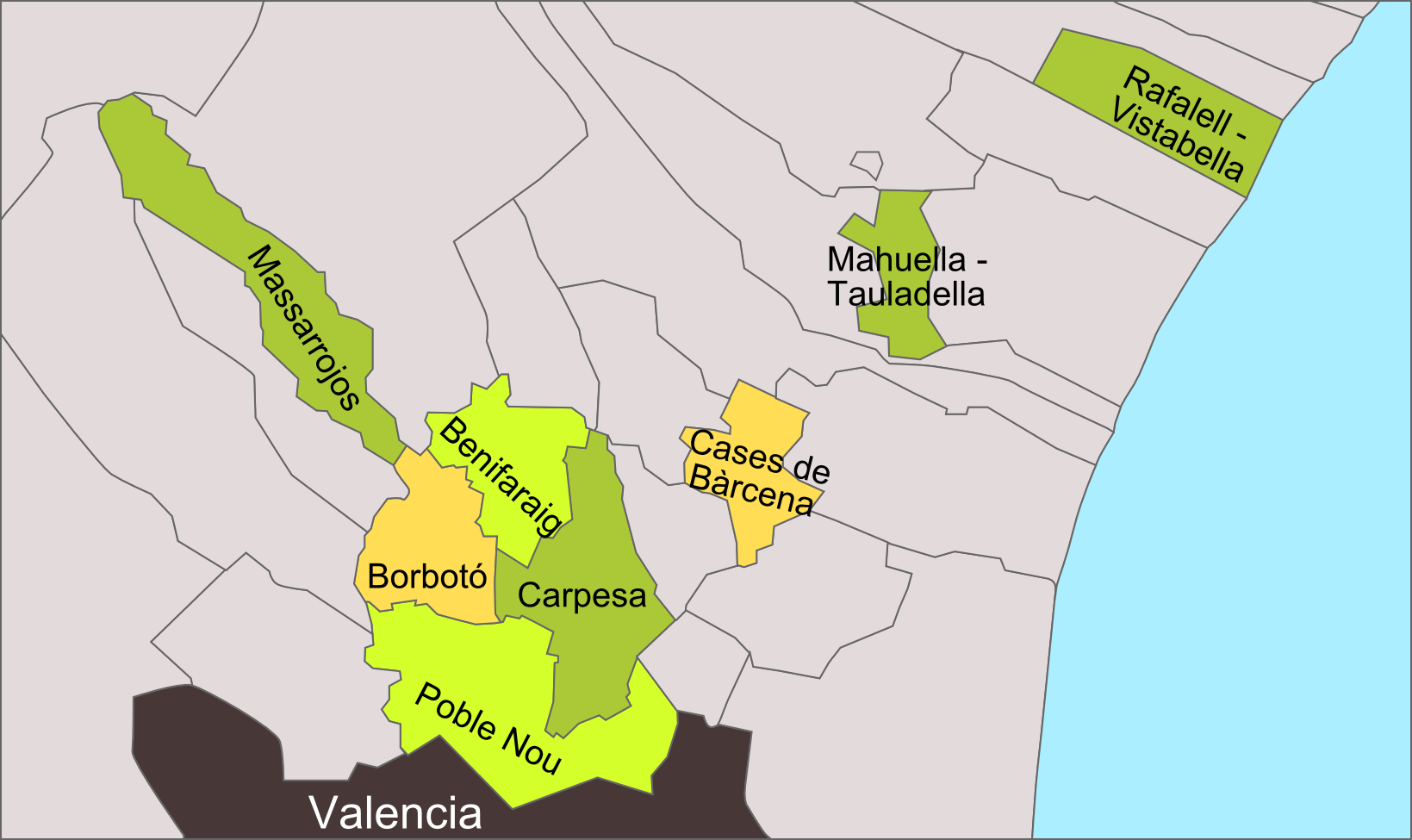
- Interactive map of Pobles del Nord
- Country: Spain
- Autonomous community: Valencian Community
- Province: Valencia
- Comarca: Comarca de València
- Municipality: Valencia
- Neighbourhoods: List: Benifaraig; Borbotó; Carpesa; Casas de Bárcena; Masarrochos; Mahuella, Tauladella, Rafalell y Vistabella; Poble Nou

Area
  - Total: 15.196 km^{2} (5.867 sq mi)

Population (2024)
  - Total: 7,009
  - Density: 461.2/km^{2} (1,195/sq mi)

Pobles del Nord (also Poblats del Nord in Valencian) is the 17th district of the city of Valencia (Spain). It is composed of seven towns, which were annexed to Valencia between 1888 and 1900, which are today considered neighborhoods: Benifaraig, Pueblo Nuevo, Carpesa, Casas de Bárcena, Mahuella, Tauladella, Rafalell i Vistabella, Masarrochos and Borbotó.

Its census population in 2009 was 6563 inhabitants (INE). It is the second largest district in Valencia, although one of the least populated, since it is a dispersed and rural territory, where the Horta still occupies most of the land.

== Physical geography ==
Pobles del Nord are located on a portion of the alluvial fan created by the Turia River. These lands are composed mostly of gravel, sand and silty and clayey deposits, making them suitable for agricultural use. It is crossed from west to east by the Carraixet and Andolsa ravines and the irrigation canal of Moncada (Real Acequia de Moncada, RAM).

The main territory, which is composed of the neighborhoods of Benifaraig, Borbotó, Carpesa, Masarrochos and Poble Nou, forms a wedge of land that advances northward from the city of Valencia, and is bounded by the so-called Arc of Moncada. The places of Casas de Bárcena and Mahuella, Tauladella, Rafalell i Vistabella form three scattered enclaves in the region of the Horta Nord. The last one, Rafalell-Vistabella, is the only place with a sea front, about 800 m of beach where the Marjal de Rafalell-Vistabella is located.

== History ==
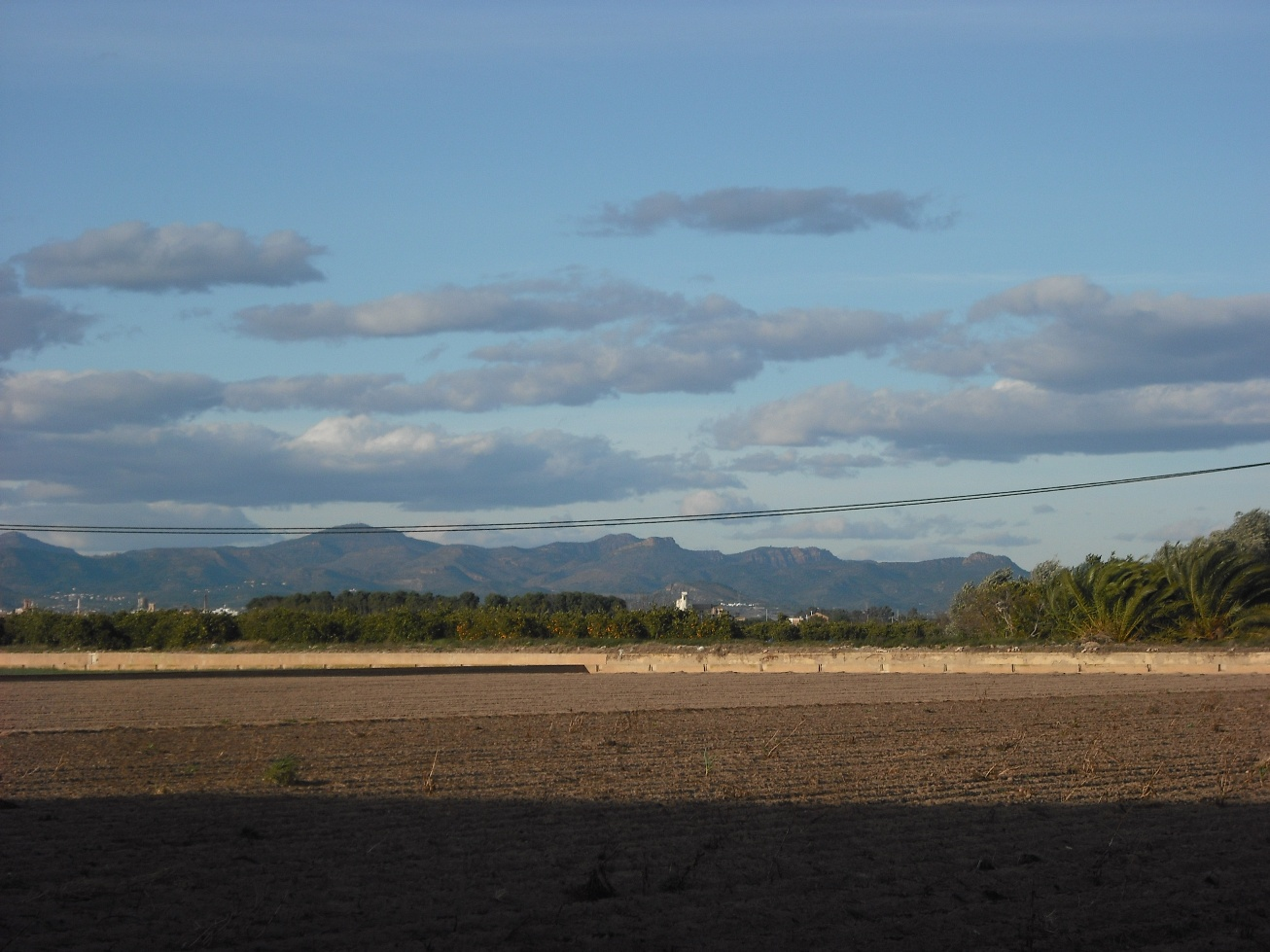
Orchards between Carpesa and Benifaraig.

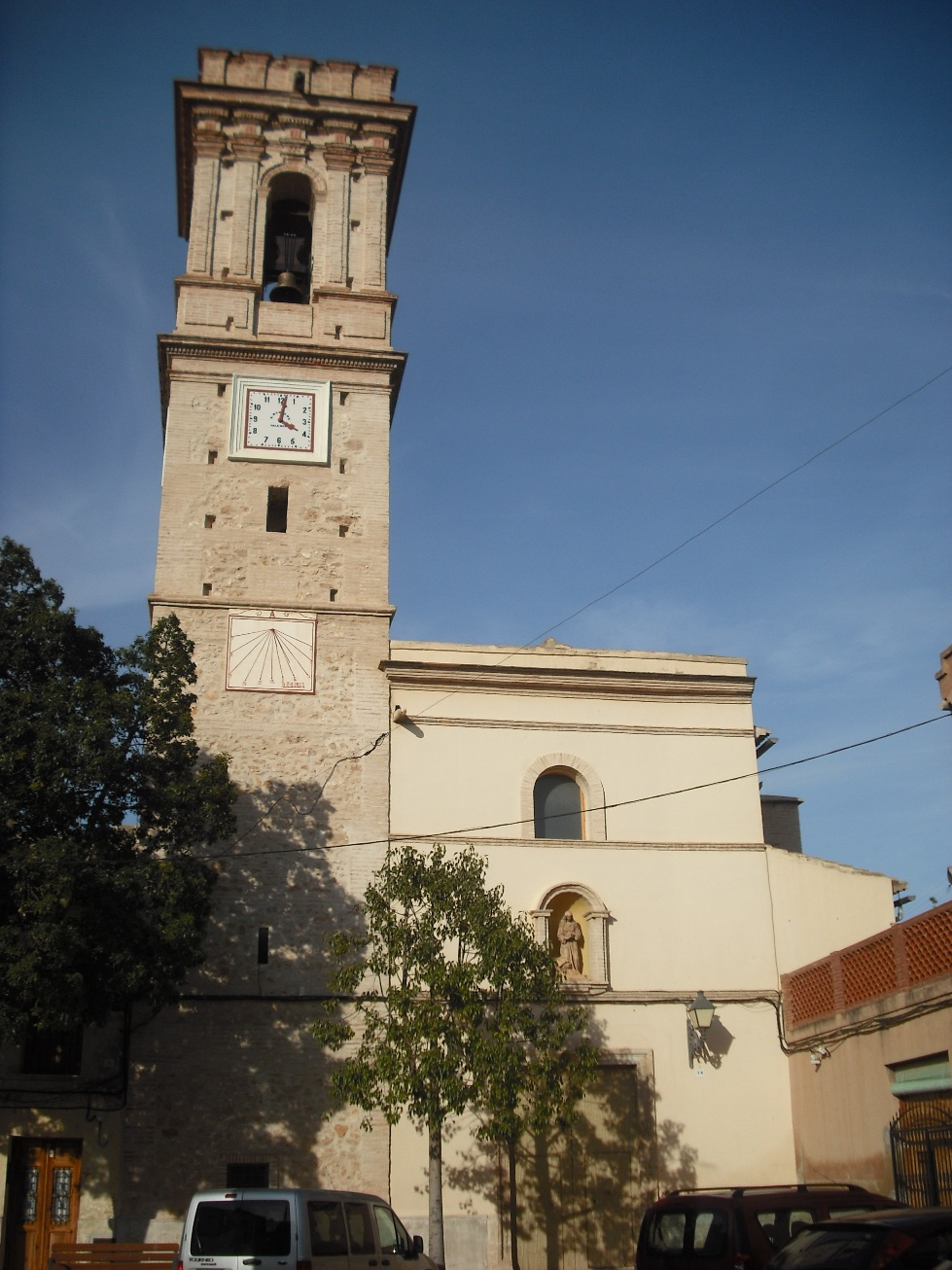
Church of Mary Magdalene of Benifaraig.

The great majority of the nuclei that make up this district have their origin in the Andalusian alqueria that were scattered throughout the Turia meadow, although Roman remains have been found in Carpesa. All the alquerias were taken during the Christian conquest by James I of Aragon and most of them were under the control of the Order of the Temple and, when it was dissolved, passed to the Order of Montesa. When the lordships disappeared in 1811, most of them became independent districts.

The district itself appeared between 1888 and 1900 under the name of Distrito de la Vega. This process, motivated by different interests, took place thanks to a decree that allowed large cities to annex neighboring districts of less than 2000 inhabitants, and that Valencia had begun to enforce in the 1870s. The first places to be annexed were Borbotó and Carpesa in 1888, and the last was Benifaraig, in 1900. In 1981, a reorganization of the districts of Valencia took place, in which the name was changed to Pobles del Nord.

== Demographics ==
The population of the district has remained practically stable throughout the 20th century and the first decade of the 21st century, although the trend is mainly downward. The strongest loss of population occurred in Mahuella, Tauladella, Rafalell i Vistabella, since, being an eminently rural area, the only compact nucleus being that of Mahuella, it has suffered strongly from the rural exodus. The most significant increase has been experienced by Masarrochos since the conurbation with Moncada came into effect.

Demographic evolution of Pobles del Nord
	1910	1940	1960	1981	2001	2009
Benifaraig	722	834	809	1,023	938	1,026
Borbotó	655	765	806	758	800	742
Carpesa	791	932	1,196	1,417	1,258	1,293
Casas de Bárcena	438	614	557	596	429	398
Mahuella, Tauladella, Rafalell i Vistabella	442	441	328	104	65	66
Masarrochos	606	1,391	1,302	1,180	1,099	2,015
Poble Nou		1,706	1,563	1,407	1,408	1,023
Total	~4,000	6,683	6,561	6,485	5,997	6,563

== Policy ==
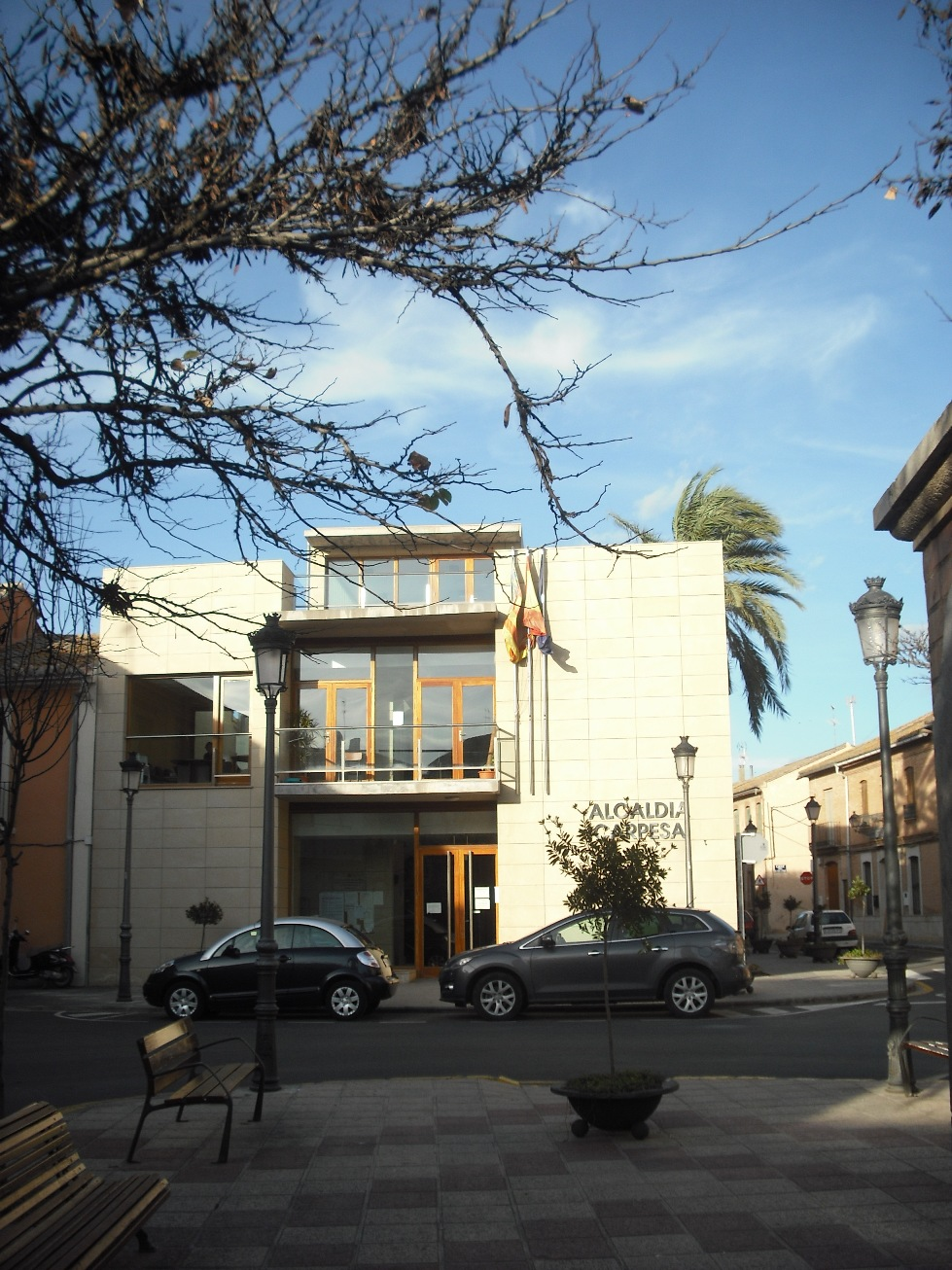
Carpesa City Hall, in the Plaza del Poble.

Pobles del Nord depend on the Valencia City Council as a district. However, given their status as rural settlements, they have, in accordance with the relevant state and autonomous community laws, six local government who are responsible for ensuring the proper functioning of the neighborhood and civic relations, signing administrative reports and submitting proposals, suggestions, complaints and claims from neighbors to the city council. The local government's offices are located in Benifaraig, Borbotó, Carpesa, Casas de Bárcena (which includes Mahuella, Tauladella, Rafalell i Vistabella), Masarrochos and Poble Nou.

== Economy ==
During the 19th century, the main engine of the economy was the production of silk, wheat, hemp, beans and vegetables, as well as stone quarrying in Masarrochos. In one of the quarries, Andalusian pottery was found, denoting the antiquity of this activity. Today Pobles del Nord are facing demographic decline and an aging population, facts that make the district's economy much less competitive.

== Transportation ==
Pobles del Nord are a group of semi-urban nuclei connected to each other by a series of roads, most of which still exist. The main roads in the main body of the district are the old N-340, now converted into the CV-300, and the CV-315. The scattered enclaves are close to the V-21 highway, although they are not easily accessible.

== Utilities ==
Pobles del Nord have two auxiliary medical offices, one in Benifaraig and the other in Carpesa. They also have several activity centers for the elderly, as well as sports facilities.

=== Carpesa wastewater treatment plant ===
The Department of the Environment is planning the construction of a wastewater treatment plant (WWTP) between Carpesa and Bonrepòs i Mirambell, on the edge of the Carraixet ravine. The planned plant will cover an area of 50,000 m^{2} and will receive water from the collectors of Masarrochos, Moncada, Rocafort and Godella, which will then be discharged into the ravine to allow its reuse through a tertiary system. This plan, however, has been rejected from the outset by the citizens of Carpesa and Bonrepòs i Mirambell, supported by the district of the latter, as they allege that the plant is to be built in a protected orchard area, less than 200 meters from homes and a school.

== Patrimony ==
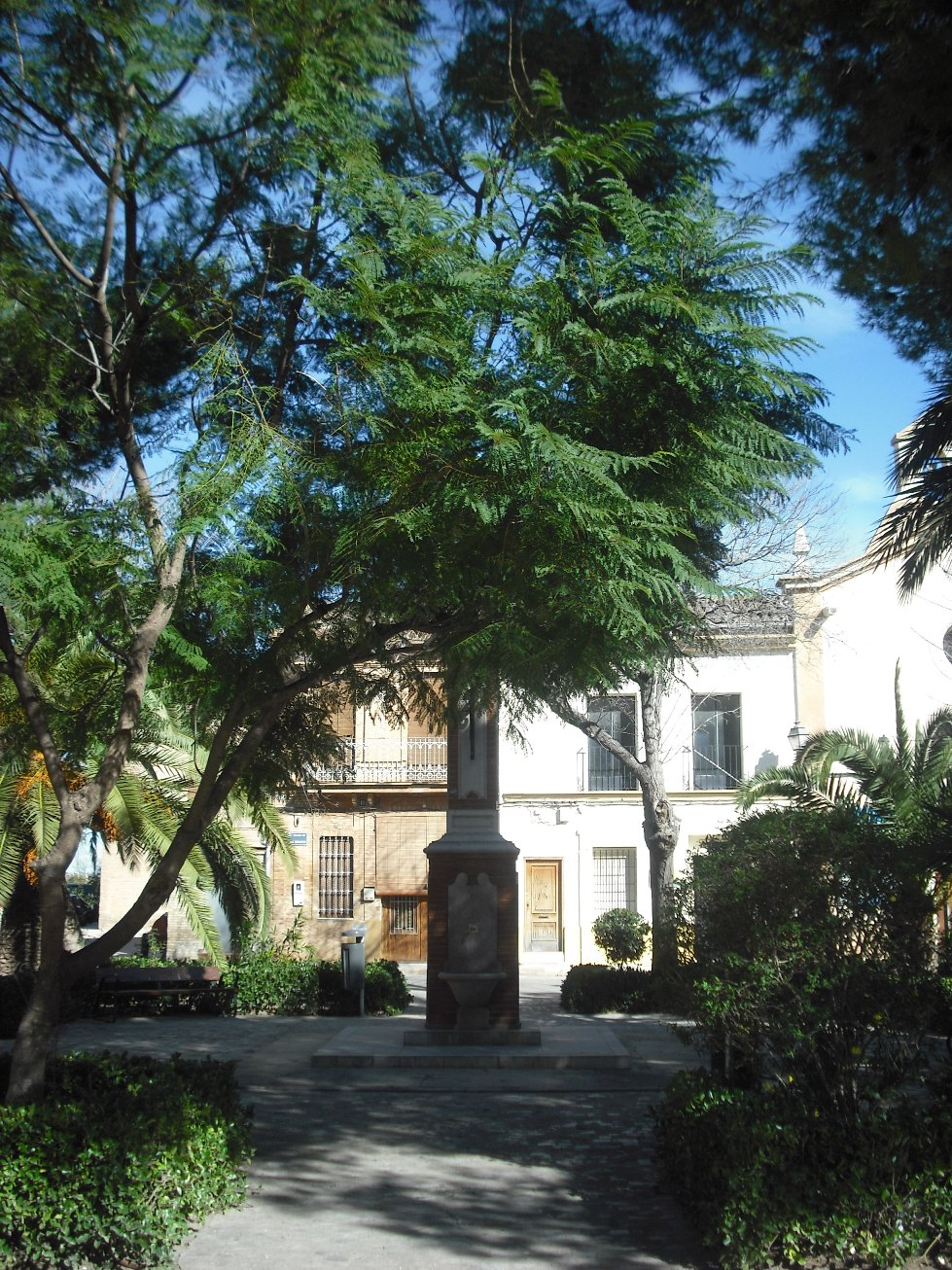
St. Benedict of Mahuella Square.

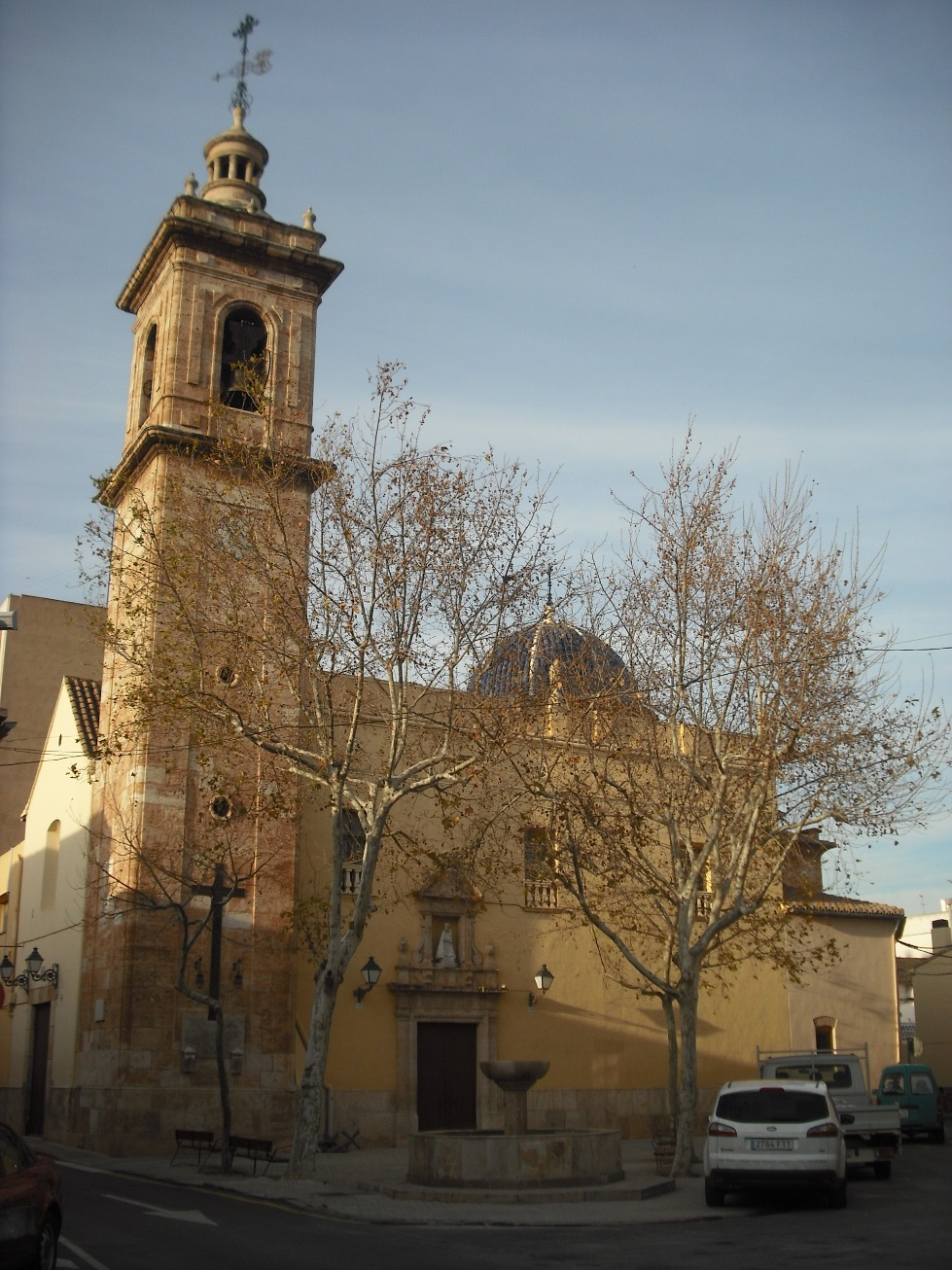
Church of the Assumption of Masarrochos

Given the rural condition of the district, the urban center of most of the nuclei are part of the heritage, since, especially Masarrochos, Benifaraig and Mahuella, are in very good condition and almost unaltered. Among the architectural heritage of the district, the following stand out:

- Church of St. Mary Magdalene of Benifaraig: It was built in the early 17th century over the chapel of the old palace of the lord, of which no vestiges remain. On its facade we read the inscription "Ave Maria 1686". The facade is made of brick and the bell tower has three sections. It has a single nave with chapels in the buttresses and is covered by a barrel vault.
- Church of St. Anne of Borbotó: It dates from the 17th century and depended on the church of Carpesa until 1942. It has a Latin cross plan, consisting of three naves and five bays. It has a half-orange glazed dome and a low, pointed bell tower. The decoration dates mainly from the 19th century, highlighting the main altarpiece of the mysterious Maestro de Borbotó, from the early 16th century. It is composed of nine Renaissance style tables, having St. Anne as the central image, which is completed with other biblical characters. Also noteworthy is the so-called Quadro de les Ànimes, from the end of the 15th century, which represents the heavenly city and the final judgment.
- Church of St. Abdón and Senén of Carpesa: It is of the late 18th or early 19th century, when the place still belonged to the old Order of Montesa. It has three naves, the main nave having a barrel vault roof. A cornice with a metal railing runs over Corinthian pilasters that frame the semicircular arches that communicate with the lateral naves. The presbytery has an apse vault and at the foot of the nave is the choir. The church was dedicated to St. Peter until 1942, when it was changed to the current dedication.
- Church of the Assumption of Masarrochos: It originally had a rectangular floor plan and a single nave, but underwent reforms in the 17th century, where the transept and apse were added, so the current floor plan is a Latin cross. The construction of the bell tower began on 27 August 1887, and was completed on 7 July 1895, the day on which the weathervane was placed. Its main characteristic is that it is entirely made of stone, unlike most of the bell towers in the region, and this because it was built by the inhabitants of the district at the time, who were mainly dedicated to stone extraction and carving.
- Alquerias of Poble Nou: The 16th century alqueria of Pi, first owned by the Count of Pinohermoso and later by the Count of Montornés, stands out. Today it has been renovated and is used as a hall for celebrations. Also of interest are the Alqueria of Falcó, dating from before 1698; the Alqueria Fonda and the Alqueria de Tallaròs, dating from before 1689.

== Urbanism ==
Despite the growth of the nuclei that make up the district, they can be grouped into three groups:

- Linear growth: Along a roadway, and generally fragmented, such as Casas de Bárcena and Poble Nou.
- Nuclear growth: At the crossroads of two or more roads, as is the case of Borbotó, Carpesa, Masarrochos and Benifaraig.
- Dispersed: Made up of a series of alquerias with hardly any signs of urban centers, as in the four districts that make up Mahuella, Tauladella, Rafalell i Vistabella.

All the urban centers of the district are isolated and surrounded by orchards, with the exception of Masarrochos, which is bordered by Moncada at its western end.

== Culture ==
There are branches of the Popular University of Valencia in Benifaraig, Carpesa, Casas de Bárcena and Masarrochos, as well as various associations in the larger towns. All of the neighborhoods celebrate their main festivals between June and August. The festivities of St. Theresa in Benifaraig, those of Saints Abdón and Senén in Carpesa, due to their antiquity, and the patron saint festivities of Masarrochos stand out. Finally, in Borbotó there is a great tradition of Valencian pilota.
