= Vistabella =

Vistabella may refer to:

- Vistabella, Zaragoza or Vistabella de Huerva in Aragon, Spain
- Vistabella del Maestrat in the Valencian Community
- Vistabella River in San Fernando, Trinidad and Tobago
- Vistabella, Tarragona in Catalonia
- Vistabella, Santa Cruz de Tenerife in the Canary Islands
- Mahuella, Tauladella, Rafalell y Vistabella in Valencia City
- Vistabella, Níjar in Andalusia
- Vistabella, a quarter in the city of Murcia
