= Benifaraig, Valencia =

Pedania in Valencia, Spain

Benifaraig Benifaraig
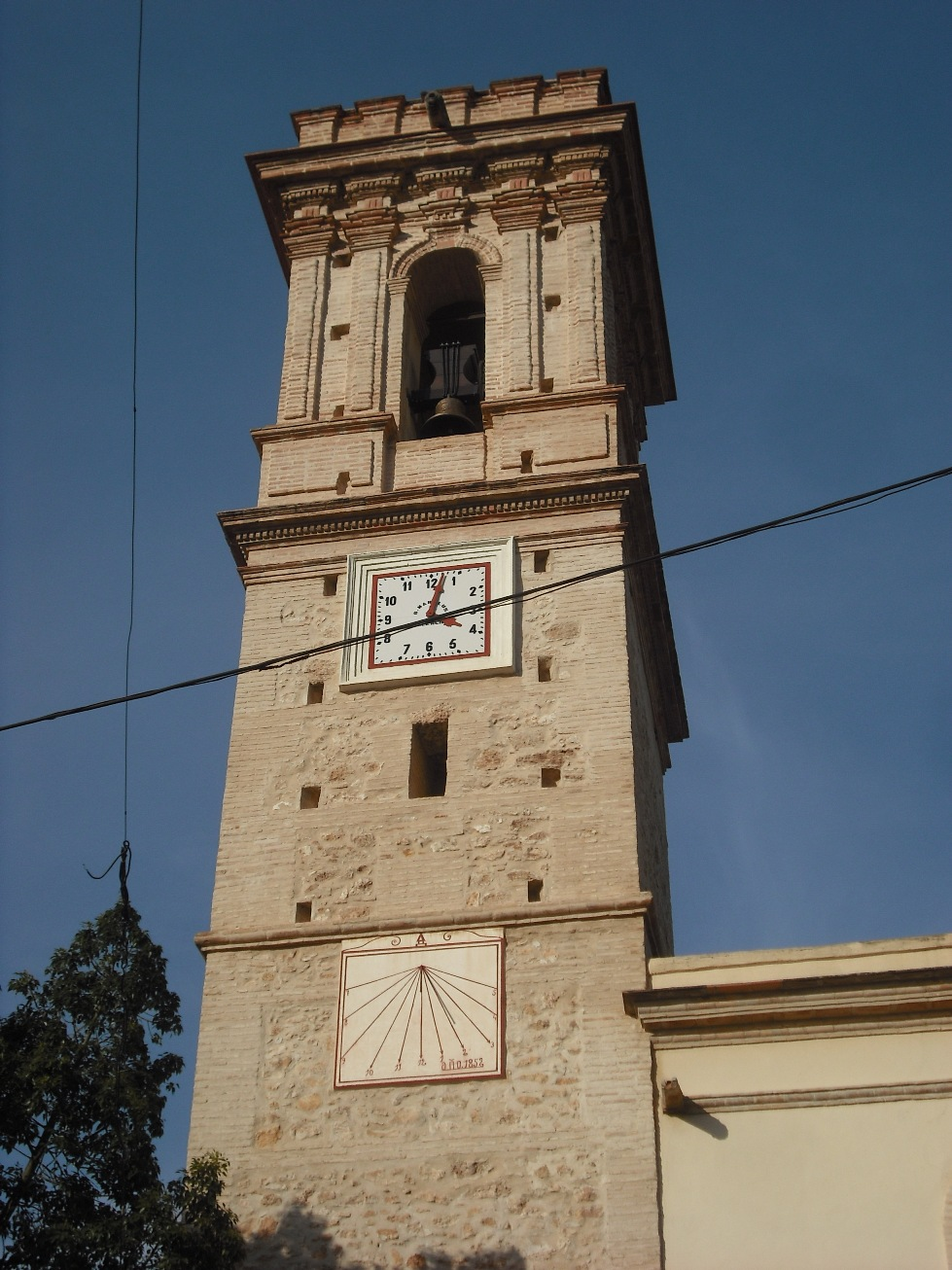

- Flag Seal

- Location within Spain
- Coordinates: 39°31′42″N 0°23′9″W
- Country: Spain
- Autonomous community: Valencian Community
- Province: Province of Valencia
- Comarca: Horta of Valencia
- Judicial districts: Valencia
- Municipality: Valencia

Government
  - Mayor: Joan Ribó i Canut

Area
  - Total: 1,423 km^{2} (549 sq mi)

Population
  - Total: 933
  - Density: 655.66/km^{2} (1,698.2/sq mi)
- Website: https://web.archive.org/web/20141221084006/http://www.poblenouvalencia.com/

Benifaraig is a pedania of the city of Valencia (Spain), belonging to the district of Poblados del Norte. It is bordered on the west by Godella, on the east by Alfara del Patriarca, on the north by Moncada and on the south by Borbotó and Carpesa. Its census population in 2022 was 993 inhabitants. It was an independent municipality until 1900, when it became a pedania of the city of Valencia.

== Toponymy ==
The toponym Benifaraig is clearly Arabic. While beni can be understood as بني (banī) "sons (of)" or إبن (ibn) "son (of)," the etymology of faraig is uncertain. It is probable that it derives from فرج (Faraǧ), a proper name; understanding then the toponym as "[place of] the sons of Fara". According to Gaspar Escolano it would derive from Abenalfarache, name of a bailiff of Valencia during the 11th century, of Moroccan lineage, specifically from Aduar Uled Farache. According to Alcover, however, it would come from Arabic ḥara ("prohibition, anger or enchantment").

== History ==
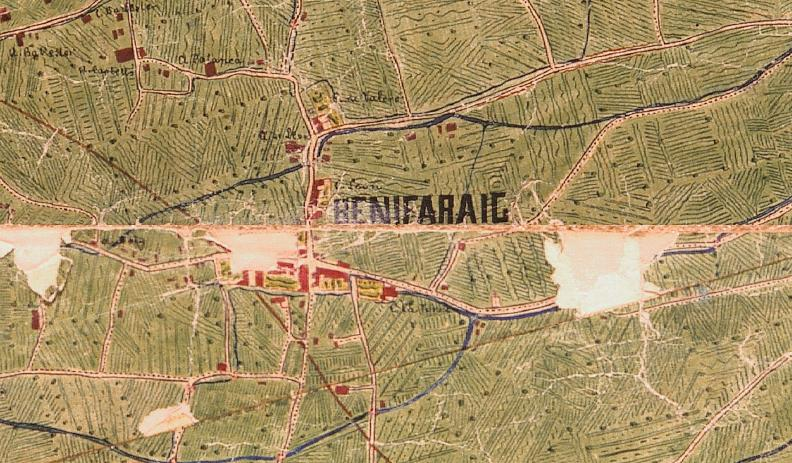
Benifaraig in 1883.

The alquería de Benifaraig was founded between 1092 and 1102. James I donated it to Eximén Pérez de Tarazona in 1241 after conquering it. In 1251, Pérez d'Arenós ceded the place, together with Masarrochos, to the Knights Templar, in exchange for Albentosa (Teruel). When the Templar was extinguished, the properties passed to the Order of Montesa. The population of the place was about 80 people in 1510, and almost doubled in the early 1600s, although it decreased later. Pascual Madoz gave the following description in 1849:

Place with town hall in the province [...] of Valencia (4 leagues) [...] Located on a plain to the right of the Carraixet ravine [...] It has 53 houses with the town hall and jail, all of them of regular construction, and 44 barracks like all of those in the Valencia huerta. There is also a church (St. Mary Magdalene), annexed to the parr. of Moncada [...] The land is all orchard of very good quality, which is irrigated with the irrigation channel of Moncada, and there are mulberry trees. The roads leading to the neighboring towns are in very good condition [...] Pop: 105 neighbors, 726 souls.

— Diccionario de Madoz

Its autonomy ended on 18 August 1900, when it was annexed to the city of Valencia.

== Demography ==
Benifaraig, located on the northern boundary of the municipality, has slightly increased its population in the last century, although with large ups and downs. Throughout the first decade of the 21st century the population increased at a steady pace, although this increase slowed and began to reverse during the 2010s.

Demographic evolution of Benifaraig
	1910	1920	1930	1940	1950	1960	1970	1981	1986	2001	2005	2009	2013	2017	2021
Population	722	538	766	834	1,048	809	903	1,023	1,002	938	942	1,026	1,022	1,014	988

== Politics ==
Benifaraig depends on the city council of Valencia in consideration of neighborhood of the district of Poblados del Norte (in Valencian Poblats del Nord). However, given its status as a rural settlement, it has, in accordance with the relevant state and autonomous community laws, an alcalde de barrio (in English neighborhood mayor) who is responsible for ensuring the proper functioning of the neighborhood and civic relations, signing administrative reports and submitting proposals, suggestions, complaints and claims from neighbors to the city council. The new neighborhood mayor's office building was built in 1986.

=== Municipal elections ===
Benifaraig registered a total of 589 votes for the 2019 municipal elections, of which 582 went to the City Council candidacies. These votes were distributed as follows:

Municipal candidacy	Registered votes
Compromís Municipal	184
PP	156
PSOE	86
Citizens	80
Vox	45
Podem - EUPV	21
PACMA	4
Avant	3
Alter	1
Falange Española de las JONS	1
UIG-SOMVAL-CUIDES	1

== Public services ==
Benifaraig has an auxiliary medical office, as well as an Activities Center for the elderly, which offers socio-cultural activities, physical maintenance and various workshops and courses. It also has a parish cemetery and a park.

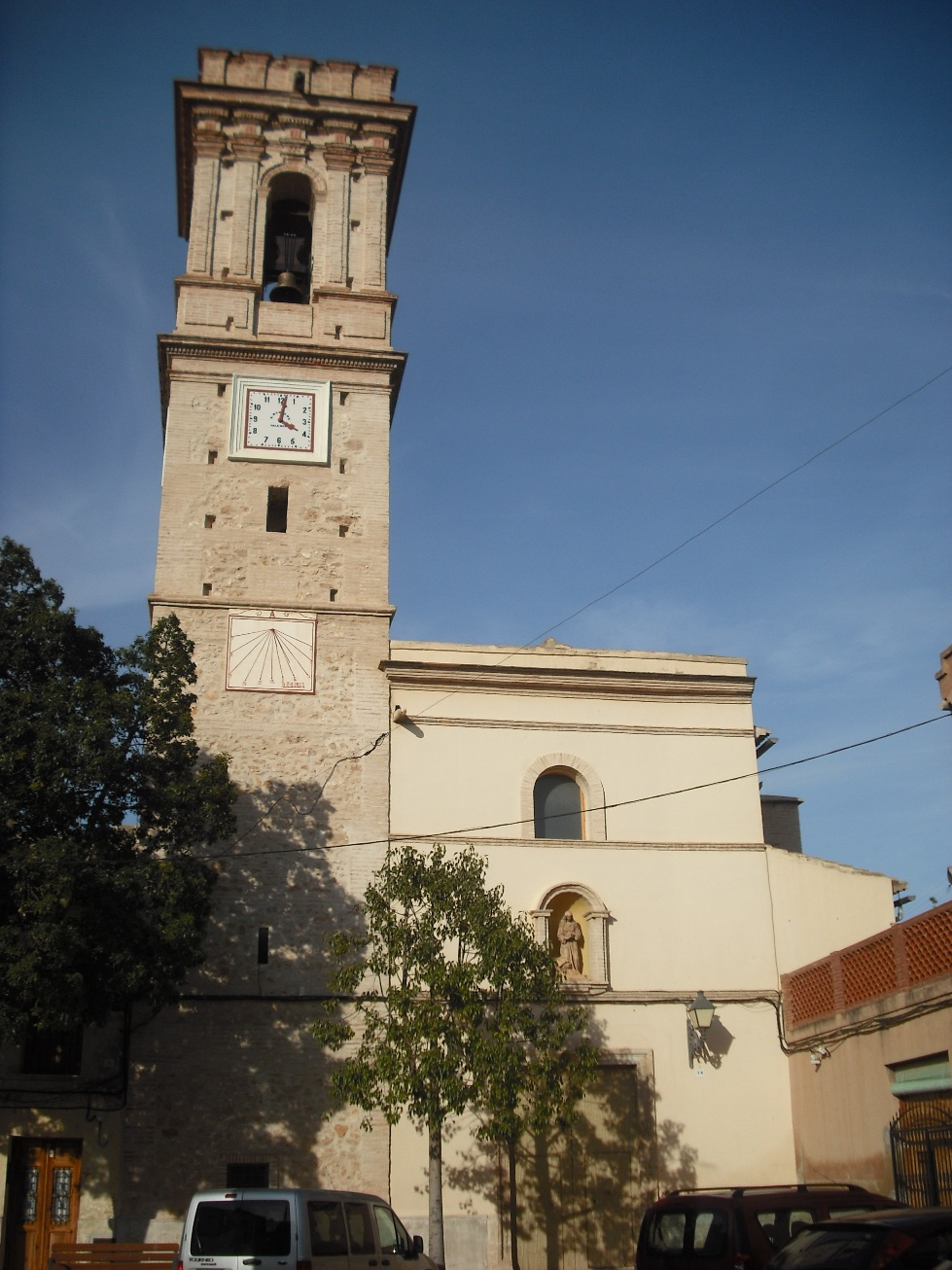
Church of Santa María Magdalena

== Patrimony ==
- Church of Santa María Magdalena: It was built at the beginning of the 17th century over the chapel of the old palace of the lord, of which no vestiges remain. The inscription "Ave María 1686" can be read on its façade. The facade is of brick, like the bell tower, of three bodies. It has a single nave with chapels in the buttresses and is covered by a barrel vault.
- Casa de la Sirena: It is integrated in the town of Benifaraig although it belongs to the municipality of Alfara del Patriarca. It is one of the few remaining fortified farmhouses in the region of La Huerta. Although the facade is in relatively good condition, the abandonment of the farm is causing it to deteriorate rapidly.

== Culture ==
Benifaraig dedicates its festivities to Mary Magdalene and Santísimo Cristo Verdadero (in English Most Holy True Christ) with a series of activities that are held from 22 July to 6 August. In addition, it has a headquarters of the Universitat Popular de València, where culturization activities, plastic and corporal expression and occupational training, among others, are carried out. It also has since 2011 with the Sociedad Musical Amics de la Música de Benifaraig, that belongs to the cultural association and integrates the School of Music as well as its Music Band. This association carries out numerous cultural activities, as well as concerts and musical events.
