= Carpesa =

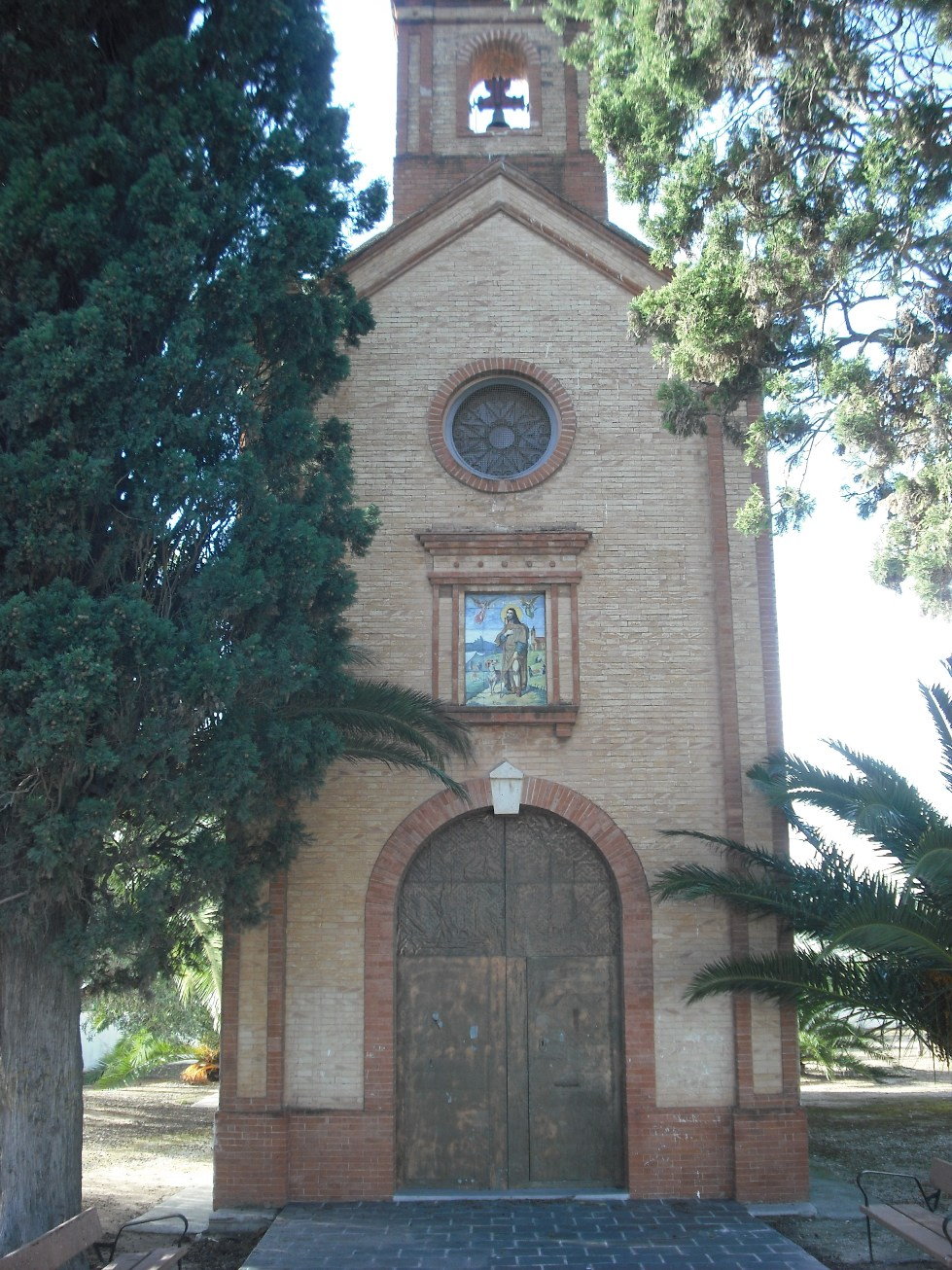
- A church in Carpesa
- Interactive map of Carpesa
- Coordinates: 39°31′00″N 0°22′40″W
- Country: Spain
- Province: Valencia
- Municipality: Valencia
- Elevation: 27 m (89 ft)

Population (2017)
  - Total: 1,215
- Demonym(s): carpesano /a (va) carpesà /ana

Carpesa is a village under the local government of the municipality of Valencia, in the province of the same name, in Spain. It was an independent municipality until 1888. It borders with Benifaraig, Alfara del Patriarch and Vinalesa to the north, Bonrepós i Mirambell and Tavernes Blanques to the east, Pueblo Nuevo to the east and Brobotó to the west. Its population was 1,215 inhabitants in 2017 (INE).

== History ==
There are remains of worship to Jupiter during Roman times in the Carpesa area. At the time of al-Ándalus it was the farmhouse. Jaime I took it during the conquest of Valencia, and handed it to Bernardo Vidal de Besalú, as it is said in the Llibre del Repartiment. Then Vidal sold it to the king. On May 29, 1246, it was handed to the Knights Templar, and placed in Russafa. According to Rafael Martí de Viciana (1546) the first Christian settlers arrived in 1243. After that Carpesa passed to the order of Montesa.

In 1574, the parish of Carpesa went on to depend on Mirambell and Casas de Bárcena. Carpesa was constituted as an independent municipality with the dissolution of the Lordships. At that time there were 600 inhabitants, more than 100 houses and 2 schools.

It was an independent municipality until 1898, until Valencia was annexed.

=== Toponymy ===
The name of Carpesa seems to derive from the preindouropean base K to R (stone), intensified by the Ibero-Basque -p e. Its ending with -esa is related to other pre-Romanic toponimos such as Oropesa, Manresa etc. Martínez Aloy de Espinalt, however, suggests it to derive from the Latin carpere (take).

== Politics ==
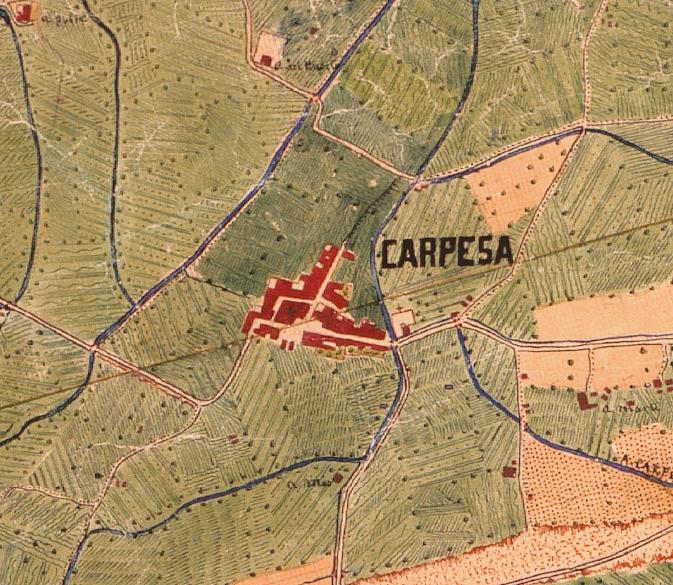
Carpesa in 1883

Carpesa is led by the local town government of Valencia in consideration of the district of Poblats del Nord. However, with the status of a rural settlement, it operates in accordance with the relevant state and autonomous laws and neighborhood mayor that is responsible for ensuring the proper functioning of the neighborhood and civic relations, signing administrative reports and elevating all suggestions, denunciations and claims of neighbors.

== Economy ==
One of the main problem is the demographic decrease and aging, as a consequence of the lack of aid to establish housing for young people, the successive impediments to carry out public works, or the lack of economic development. The reason is the proximity of the hamlet to the city of Valencia itself.

== Culture ==
Carpesa is known for keeping different cultural traditions throughout its history such as Falles de Valencia and its patronal parties (Fiestas Patronales), founded in 1731. There are different cultural associations, such as the Taurine Cultural Association "El Carpesano", the Club of Retired and Pensioners and the music band of Drums and Cornets and the Hockey Club. It also has one headquarters in the Universidad Popular, where cultural events and trainings are carried out.
