= Mauella, Tauladella, Rafalell i Vistabella =

Rural hamlets and rural areas in Valencia, Spain

Mahuella, Tauladella, Rafalell y Vistabella Mauella, Tauladella, Rafalell i Vistabella
- Hamlets and rural areas
- Flag Coat of arms

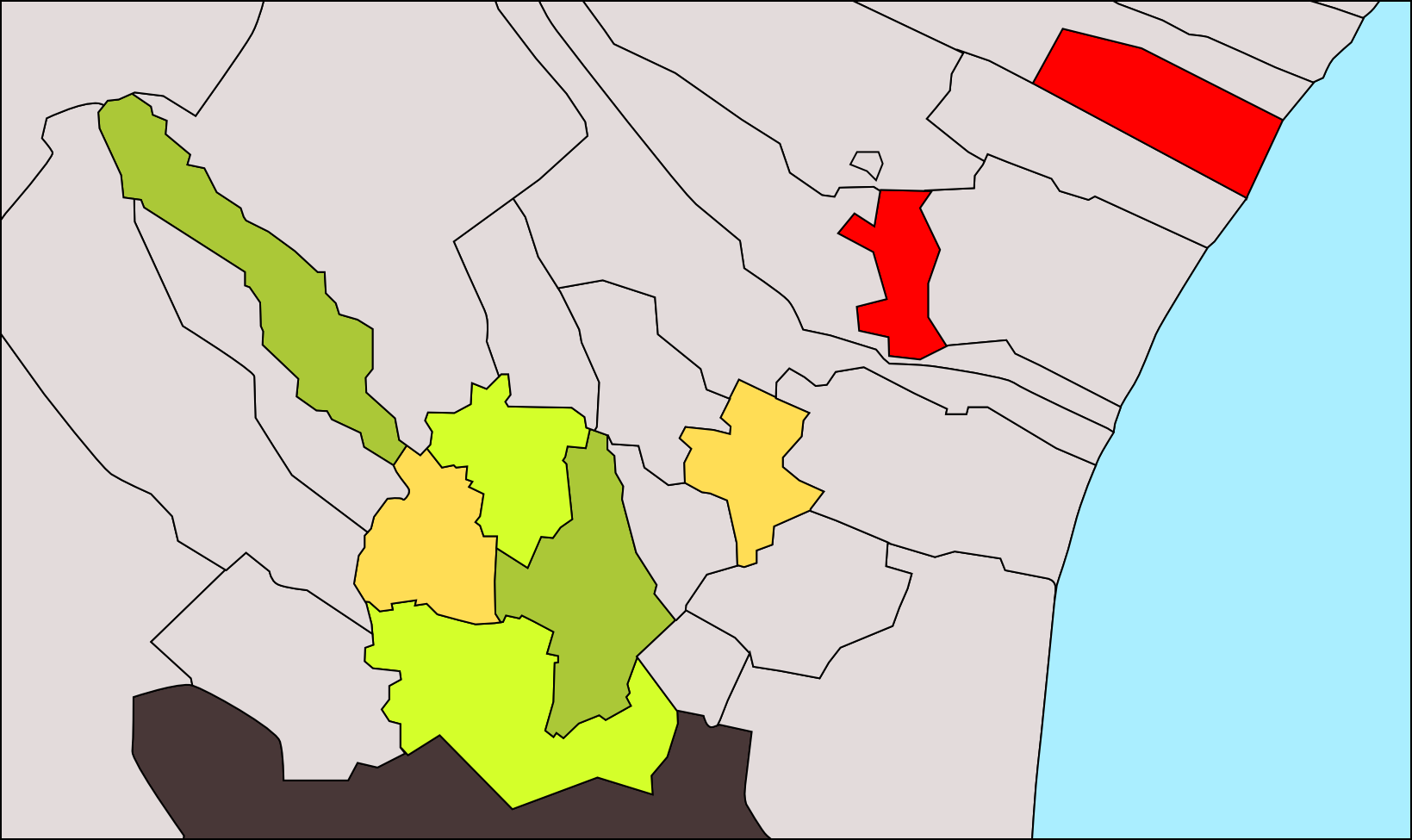
- Interactive map of Mahuella, Tauladella, Rafalell y Vistabella
- Coordinates: 39°32′26″N 0°20′03″W
- Country: Spain
- Aut. community: Valencian Community
- Province: Valencia
- Comarca: Horta Nord
- Judicial district: Valencia
- Municipality: Valencia

Area
  - Total: 1,069 km^{2} (413 sq mi)
- Elevation: 13 m (43 ft)

Population (2022)
  - Total: 57
- Predominant language: Valencian
- Website: Valencia City Council website

Mauella, Tauladella, Rafalell i Vistabella are a group of hamlets and rural areas (partidas) of the city of Valencia, in the Horta Nord comarca and belonging to the Poblats del Nord district.

For administrative purposes they are considered a single unit, with its centre in the hamlet of Mahuella. However, it consists of two geographically separate and distinct enclaves separated from each other by the municipalities of Albuixech and Massalfassar. The first, Mahuella-Tauladella, borders to the north with Museros, to the east with Albuixech and to the south and west with Albalat dels Sorells. The second, Rafalell-Vistabella, is located further north, and borders to the north and west with Massamagrell, to the south with Massalfassar and to the east with the Mediterranean Sea. Their combined population as of the 2022 census was 57 inhabitants.

== Hamlets ==
=== Mahuella ===
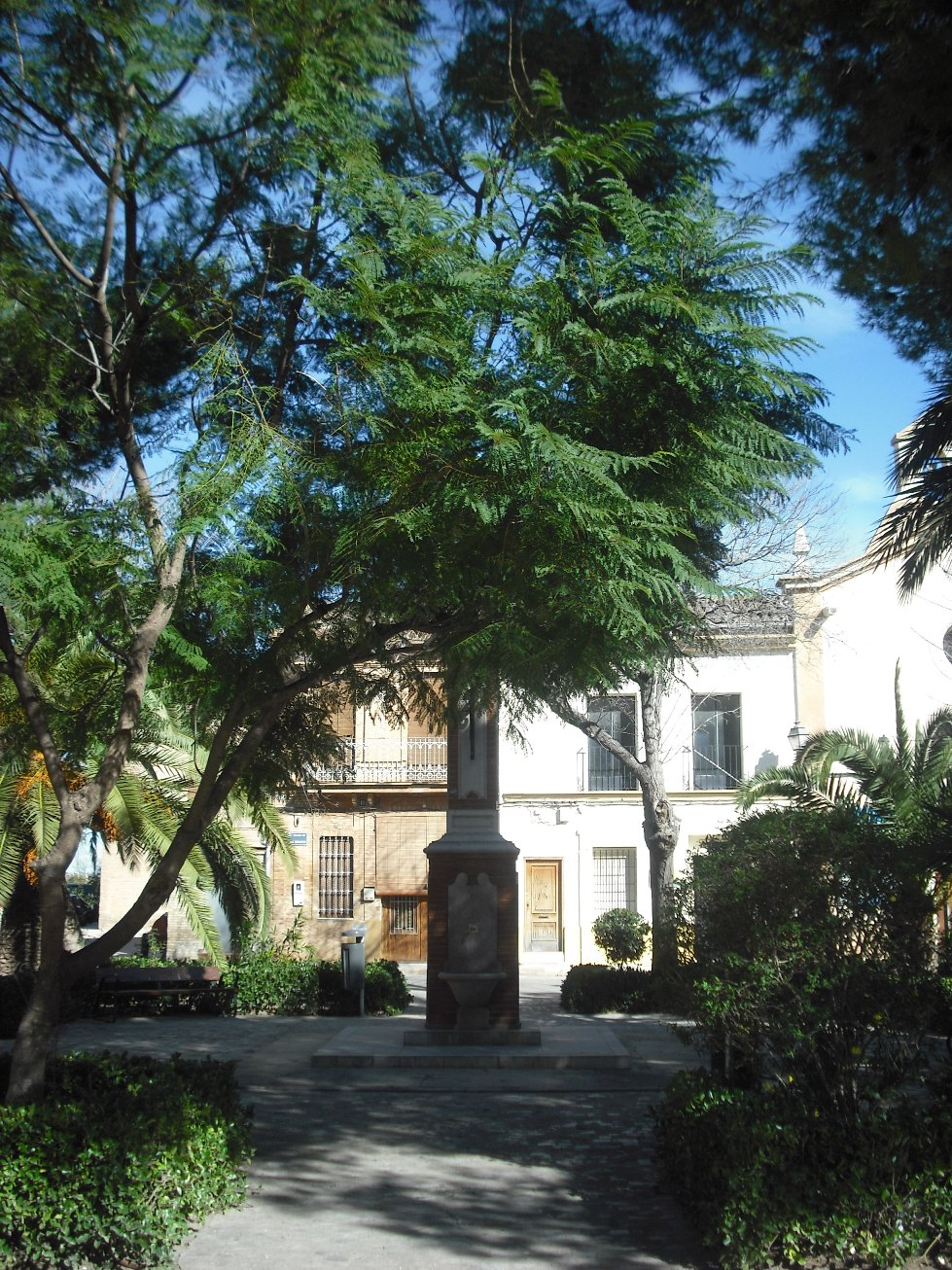
Plaça de Sant Benet, centre of the Mahuella hamlet.

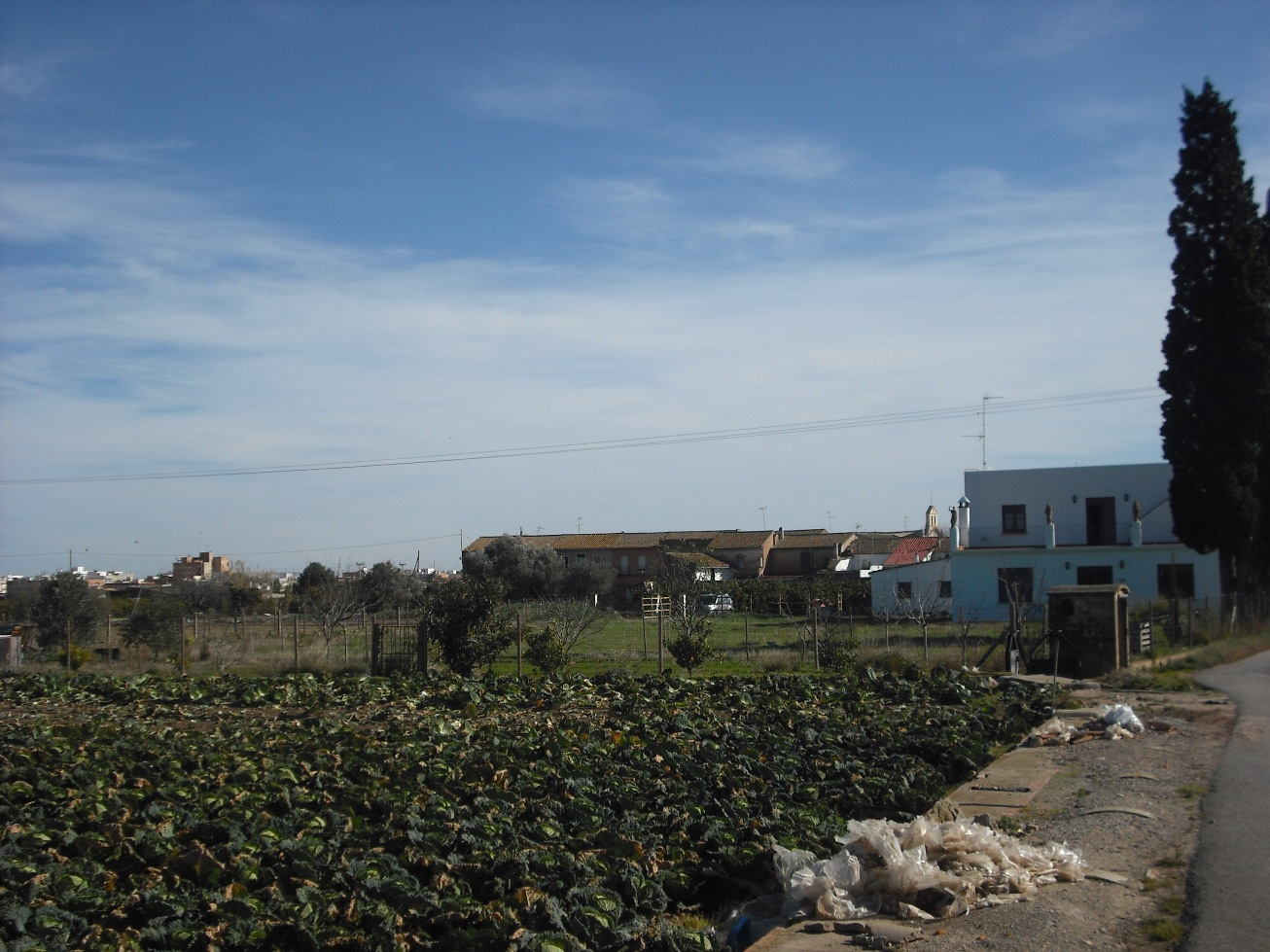
Huerta near Mahuella.

It constitutes a compact nucleus around a square surrounded by maple trees, in which there is a church dedicated to Saint Benedict and the town hall. The village stands out for the almost total absence of newly constructed buildings, thus preserving the typical appearance of a Huerta village. To the south, however, there is a low-density continuity of buildings along the road that connects it with Albuixech, forming the so-called Barrio del Horno, belonging to the latter municipality. It can be accessed from Albuixech by the aforementioned road and from the CV-300 road near Albalat dels Sorells.

The settlement originated as a Muslim alquería. Its name, according to Alcover, seems to derive from Arabic nawwela (hut), despite the difficulty of the change from n to m. However, according to historian Abel Soler Molina: “Alquería documented as Magüel·la (1238), Magüella (1335) or Mahuella, in archaic spelling. From Arabic "māwā" وَاوَىْ ‘hut, shelter’ + Romance diminutive "-ella" > *Māwālla /mawélla/, ‘the little hut’. It would be the name used by the Moors to designate the typical Valencian barracas of the Huerta”.

The alquería was granted on 1 July 1238 to Arnaldo de Vernet, as stated in the Llibre del Repartiment:

To A. de Vernet. The alquería of Maguella, adjacent to Albalat Alfauquia. 1 July A (Note: Original text: A. de Vernet. Alqueriam de Maguella, juxta Albalat Alfauquia. Kalendas julii.)

In 1450 it became the property of the Porta Coeli monastery, which received very little income as the place was almost completely depopulated. In 1610 the nucleus consisted of only three houses and was in private hands. Economic activity during the XIX century was exclusively centered on agriculture, with fruit trees and mulberry standing out to supply the silk industry of Valencia. In the Diccionario de Madoz (1845–1850) the following description appears:

"L[ugar] with its own town council in the province [...] of Valencia (1 1/4 league), judicial district of Moncada (1 hour). Sit[uated] on flat ground, next to the royal road to Catalonia, 1/2 hour dist[ant] from the Mediterranean [...] It has 12 houses and 26 barracas not forming a compact settlement, and a hermitage dedicated to Saint Benedict, belonging to the parish of Albalat dels Sorells [...] The municipal boundary borders to the N. with that of Museros; E. Albuixech; S. and W. Albalat. The land is entirely flat and irrigated, and fully planted with mulberry trees and fruit trees. There is no other road than the one from Valencia to Catalonia, which passes nearby. Production: wheat, maize, silk, melons, beans and vegetables [...] Population: 32 households, 160 inhabitants [...]'' (Note: Original text: 'L[ugar] con ayunt[amiento] de la prov[incia] [...] de Valencia (1 1/4 leg[uas]), part[ido] jud[icial] de Moncada (1 hora). Sit[uada] en terreno llano, junto al camino real de Cataluña, 1/2 hora dist[a] del Mediterráneo [...] Tiene 12 casas y 26 barracas sin formar cuerpo de pobl[ación], y una ermita dedicada á San Benito felig[resía] de la parr[oquia] de Albalat dels Sorells [...] Confina el térm[ino] por N. con el de Museros; E. Albuixech; S. y O. Albalat. El terreno es todo llano y de regadío, y plantado todo de moreras y árboles frutales. No hay mas carretera que la de Valencia a Cataluña, que pasa por sus inmediaciones. Prod[ucción]: trigo, maiz, seda, melones, judías y hortalizas [...] Pobl[ación]: 32 vec[inos], 160 alm[as] [...]')

Diccionario de Madoz

In 1891 the 12 houses and 16 barracas that made up the nucleus became a hamlet of the city of Valencia. On the main square a bilingual plaque commemorates the arrival of drinking water from Valencia in 1985.

Its patron saint festivals are dedicated to Saint Benedict and Our Lady of the Rosary.

=== Tauladella ===
It is a rural area with various alquerías, formerly attached to the hamlet mayor of the street of Murviedro (today Sagunto), so its origin is different from the other settlements to which it is annexed. Its name is more properly Teuladella, derived from Valencian teula (tile). In the Diccionario de Madoz (1845–1850) the following description appears:

Hamlet with a local neighborhood mayor dependent on the one from the street of Murviedro, outside the walls of Valencia, to whose town council [...] it belongs. Situated on flat terrain, 1 league N. of the capital and 1/2 league from the Mediterranean Sea [...] It has 5 houses, 19 barracas, and a hermitage dedicated to the Holy Kings (Santos Reyes), located inside the settlement. The land belonging to it lies between Mahuella, Albalat and Foyos [...] Pop[ulation]: 25 households, 110 inhabitants. (Note: Original text: Ald[ea] con alc[alde] de barrio dependiente del de la calle de Murviedro estramuros de Valencia, á cuyo ayunt[amiento] [...] corresponde. Sit[uada] en terreno llano á 1 leg[ua] N. de la cap[ital] y 1/2 del mar Mediterráneo [...] Tiene 5 casas, 19 barracas, y una ermita bajo la advocacion de los Santos Reyes, sit[uada] dentro de la pobl[ación]. El terreno que la pertenece se halla entre Mahuella, Albalat y Foyos [...] Pobl[ación]: 25 vec[inos], 110 alm[as].) Diccionario de Madoz

In the "alquería de Burgos", probably the oldest in the area, there is a chapel dedicated to Our Lady of the Rosary, built between 1963 and 1973 and belonging to the parish of Albalat dels Sorells.

=== Rafalell-Vistabella ===
The Rafalell-Vistabella enclave is practically depopulated, except for some farmhouses and alquerías. It is the only nucleus of the Poblats del Nord with a seafront, about 800 m of beach, and the entire area is occupied by huerta, except for a strip of marshland about 800 m wide parallel to the coast. The huerta is irrigated by the waters of the Real Acequia de Moncada. Rafalell and Vistabella, together with Pobla de Farnals, formed a small lordship. In the Diccionario de Madoz (1845–1850) the following description of Rafalell and Vistabella appears:

Hamlets with a local mayor dependent on the one from the street of Murviedro [...] They are both situated to the N. of [Valencia], at a distance of 2 leagues, on flat and delightful terrain. They present a rather singular anomaly, as they are located within the judicial district of Murviedro; and to reach them from Valencia one has to cross a large part of the territory of the Moncada district [...] They consist of 8 houses or alquerías and 5 inhabited barracas, whose residents go for spiritual services to the vicariate of Masalfasar [...] They have their own municipal boundary, which borders to the N. and W. with that of the aforementioned Masamagrell; to the E. the Mediterranean Sea, and to the S. Masalfasar. It comprises 2,000 hanegadas and 3 cuarterones of cultivated land [...] Oil, wine, wheat, maize, vegetables, legumes and rice are harvested [...] Pop[ulation]: 45 households, 64 inhabitants. (Note: Original text: Cas[eríos] con alc[alde] p[edáneo] dependiente del de la calle de Murviedro [...] Estan sit[uados] ambos hácia el N. de [Valencia], á la dist[ancia] de 2 leg[uas], en terreno llano y delicioso, ofreciendo una anomalía bastante singular, pues se hallan colocados dentro del part[ido] jud[icial] de Murviedro; y para constituirse en ellos desde Valencia hay que atravesar buena parte del terr[eno] del de Moncada [...] Se componen de 8 casas ó alq[uerías] y 5 baracas habitadas, cuyos vec[inos] acuden para el pasto espiritual á la vicaria de Masalfasar [...] Tienen térm[ino] propio, que confina por N. y O. con el del antedicho Masamagrell; E. el mar Mediterráneo, y S. Masalfasar : comprende 2,000 hanegadas y 3 cuarterones de tierra cultivada [...] Se cosecha aceite, vino, trigo, maiz, verduras, legumbres y arroz [...] Pobl[ación]: 45 vec[inos], 64 alm[as].) Diccionario de Madoz

The territory is crossed from north to south by the V-21 autovía, which has an exit at the southern limit of the enclave.

==== Marjal de Rafalell y Vistabella ====
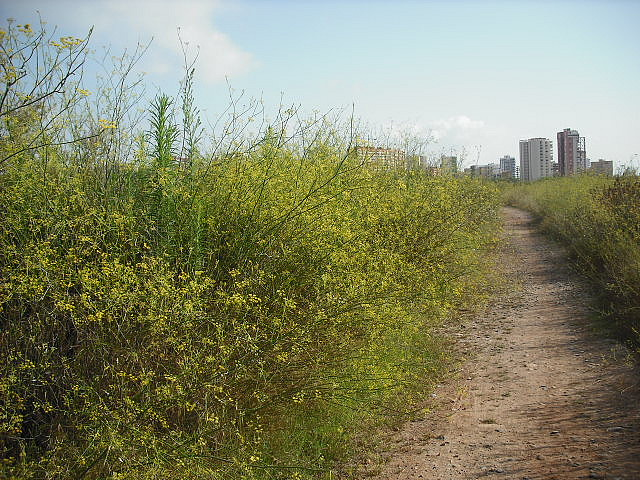
Marjal de Rafalell y Vistabella.

The Marjal de Rafalell y Vistabella (102.92 ha) is one of the last marshes that extended north of the Turia River from Alboraya to Sagunto. It is fed by groundwater and irrigation remnants. Regarding the wetland vegetation, it is dominated by reed beds and rush beds, which serve as refuge for several species of marsh and wading birds, as well as some remnants of dune vegetation on semi-fixed dunes and saltmarsh vegetation, with species such as the narrow-bracted sea-lavender (Limonium angustebracteatum) or the glasswort (Arthrocnemum fruticosum). In the marsh there are some ditches and small lagoons with submerged vegetation, such as longleaf pondweed (Potamogeton nodosus) or fennel pondweed (Potamogeton pectinatus). The fish present in the marsh are the eel (Anguilla anguilla), European seabass (Dicentrarchus labrax), flathead grey mullet (Mugil cephalus) and big-scale sand smelt (Atherina boyeri), although there are suitable habitats for the reintroduction of Valencian endemic species such as the samarugo (Valencia hispanica), Spanish toothcarp (Aphanius iberus), spined loach (Cobitis taenia) or Valencia chub (Palaemonetes zariqueyii).

In 2004 the Supreme Court of Spain upheld the ruling protecting the wetland area against plans to urbanize the marsh. Subsequently, in 2007 the Conselleria de Medio Ambiente of the Generalitat Valenciana and the Ministry of Environment, through the Confederación Hidrográfica del Júcar, carried out a restoration of the marsh at a cost of 300,000 euros funded by the European Union (FEDER). Among the actions carried out were the removal and disposal of solid waste; cleaning of sediments and deposits from the ditches to restore their drainage capacity; construction of embankments with materials deposited in previous actions and materials from the cleaning of the ditch beds. The project also included repopulation of the area with riparian vegetation, i.e. planting of species such as white poplar (Populus alba), French tamarisk (Tamarix gallica), white willow (Salix alba) and elm (Ulmus), to mark the boundary between the urban environment and the marsh.

== Geography ==
=== Demographics ===
The demographic trend of the entire group has decreased considerably throughout the twentieth century, as it is an eminently rural area, with the only compact nucleus being Mahuella, and has suffered greatly from rural exodus. The following population figures are for the entire group, although the 1910, 1920 and 1930 censuses exclude Vistabella, and those of 1950 and 1960 refer only to Mahuella-Tauladella.

Demographic trends in Mahuella, Tauladella, Rafalell, and Vistabella
	1910	1920	1930	1940	1950	1960	1970	1981	1986	2001	2005	2009
Population	442	358	394	441	386	328	198	104	90	65	56	66

== Politics ==
Mahuella, Tauladella, Rafalell y Vistabella depend on the Valencia City Council as a neighbourhood of the Poblats del Nord district (in Valencian Poblats del Nord). However, given their status as rural settlements, in accordance with the relevant state and regional laws, they have a neighbourhood mayor, shared with Casas de Bárcena, who is responsible for ensuring the proper functioning of the neighbourhood and civic relations, signing administrative reports and submitting to the city council the proposals, suggestions, complaints and claims of the residents.
