= V21 =

V21 may refer to:

- Autovía V-21, a road in Spain
- Fokker V.21, a German prototype fighter aircraft
- ITU-T V.21, a modem standard
- Tamsui metro station, in New Taipei, Taiwan
- Venture 21, an American sailboat
- V21, constitutional states in development, in the ICD-9 V codes
