= Pueblo Nuevo, Valencia =

Pedania located within the city of Valencia, Spain

Pueblo Nuevo Poble Nou
- Flag Seal

- Coordinates: 39°30′18″N 0°23′1″W
- Country: Spain
- Autonomous community: Valencian Community
- Province: Province of Valencia
- Comarca: Horta of Valencia
- Judicial districts: Valencia
- Municipality: Valencia

Government
  - Mayor: Joan Ribó i Canut

Area
  - Total: 2,920 km^{2} (1,130 sq mi)

Population
  - Total: 908
  - Density: 310.96/km^{2} (805.4/sq mi)
- Website: https://web.archive.org/web/20141221084006/http://www.poblenouvalencia.com/

Pueblo Nuevo (in Valencian and officially Poble Nou or Poblenou) is a pedania in the city of Valencia (Spain) belonging to the district of Pobles del Nord. It is bordered on the west by Burjassot, on the north by Borbotó and Carpesa and on the south by Valencia. Its population census in 2022 was 908 inhabitants.

== History ==
The nucleus of Pueblo Nuevo is located around the church of San Bernardo de Alcira, south of the town. From there, it spread northwards towards Borbotó along the road to Moncada. At the beginning of the 20th century, it became a pedania of Valencia, like the other towns in the district.

== Demography ==
The population of Pueblo Nuevo, which grew a lot since the beginning of the 20th century, began a downward trend in the 1960s that continues to be seen in recent censuses.

Demographic evolution of Pueblo Nuevo
	1950	1960	1981	1986	2001	2005	2009
Population	1.706	1.563	1.407	1.238	1.408	1.512	1.023

== Politics ==
Pueblo Nuevo depends on the city council of Valencia as a neighborhood of the district of Poblados del Norte (in valencian Poblats del Nord). However, given its status as a rural settlement, it has, in accordance with the relevant state and autonomous community laws, an alcalde de barrio (neighborhood mayor) who is responsible for ensuring the proper functioning of the neighborhood and civic relations, signing administrative reports and submitting proposals, suggestions, complaints and claims from residents to the city council.

== Public services ==
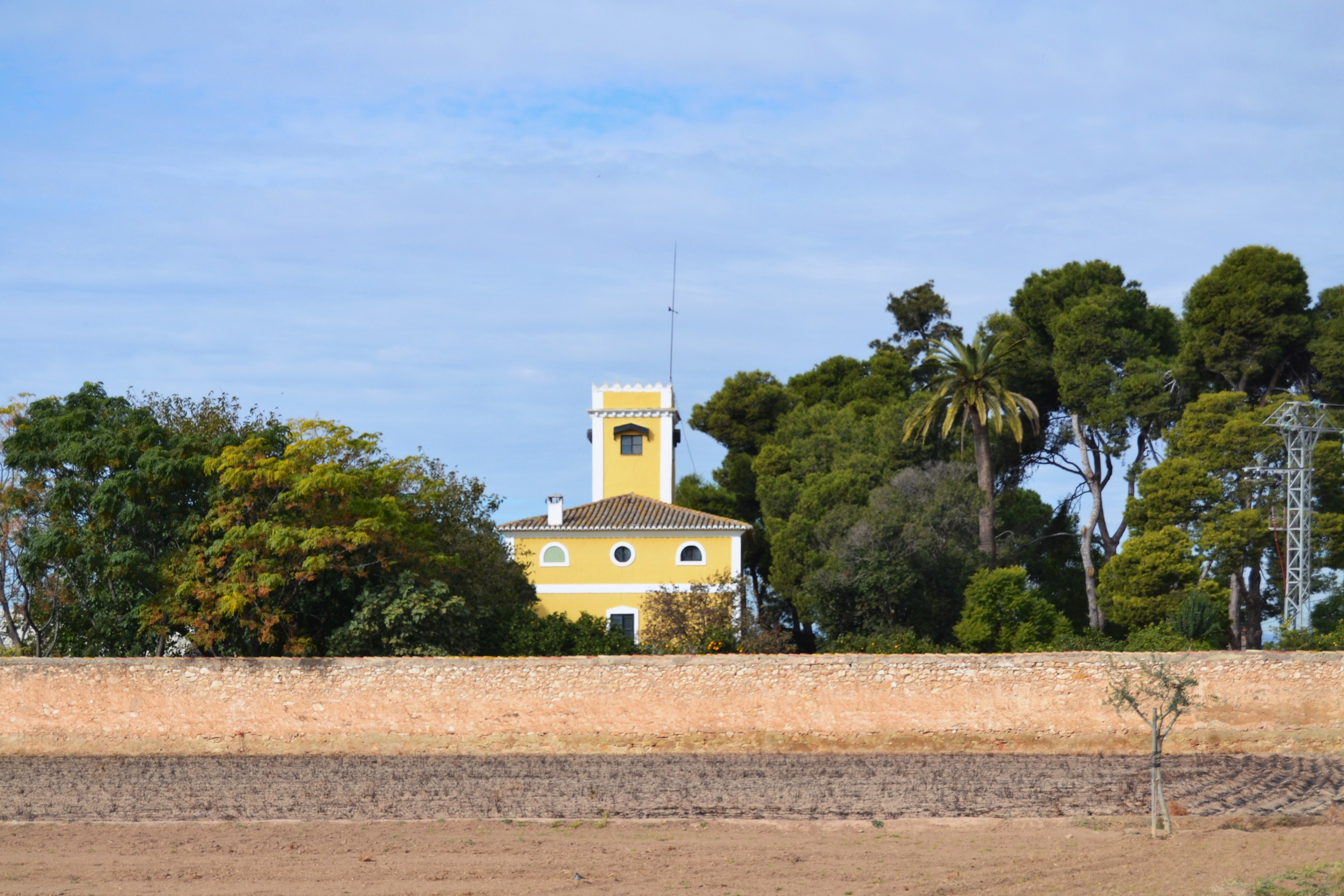
View of the Alquería del Pi

The pedania has an Activity Center for the elderly, which offers socio-cultural activities, physical maintenance and various workshops and courses.

== Patrimony ==
- Church of San Bernardo Mártir: It is located two kilometers south of the town, in the access from Valencia and nearby there is a small park. In 1942 a new parish was built in the hermitage of Pi, later moved to its present location where the temple was inaugurated on October 16, 1951, and is characterized by the sobriety and simplicity of its set. At that time the parish priest was Don Rafael Alcocer Sarrión. The name of the parish is given by the orchard of Llano de San Bernardo. The origin of the chapel is from the time of the ancestors of the Marquis of Valldaura, Don Vicente Castillo. It has two bodies: the temple with its annexes and the belfry with bells. It has a single rectangular nave and a pointed barrel vault.
- Molí dels Alters (Alters Mill): It is a flour and rice mill from the late eighteenth century or early nineteenth century completely painted white. Located opposite the church of San Bernardo in the curve that makes the Camino de Moncada, and on the Brazo de Petra that comes from the Acequia de Mestalla, in the Alters district.
- Farmhouses (Alquería): Within the limits of Pueblo Nuevo there are numerous farmhouses, some of them prior to the 17th century. It is worth mentioning the 16th century Alquería del Pi, first owned by the Count of Pino Hermoso and later by the Count of Montornés. Today it has been renovated and is used as a hall for celebrations. Also of interest are the Alquería de Falcó, dating from before 1698; the Alquería Fonda and the Alquería de Tallaròs, dating from before 1689.

== Urbanism ==
It is difficult to define the urban center, since the hamlet consists of a series of low houses lined along the edge of the road to Moncada, and its surroundings are composed of orchards. Thus, the population is distributed between this line of buildings and the farmhouses scattered among the crops.
