= Borbotó =

Coordinates: 39.5153°N 0.3908°W

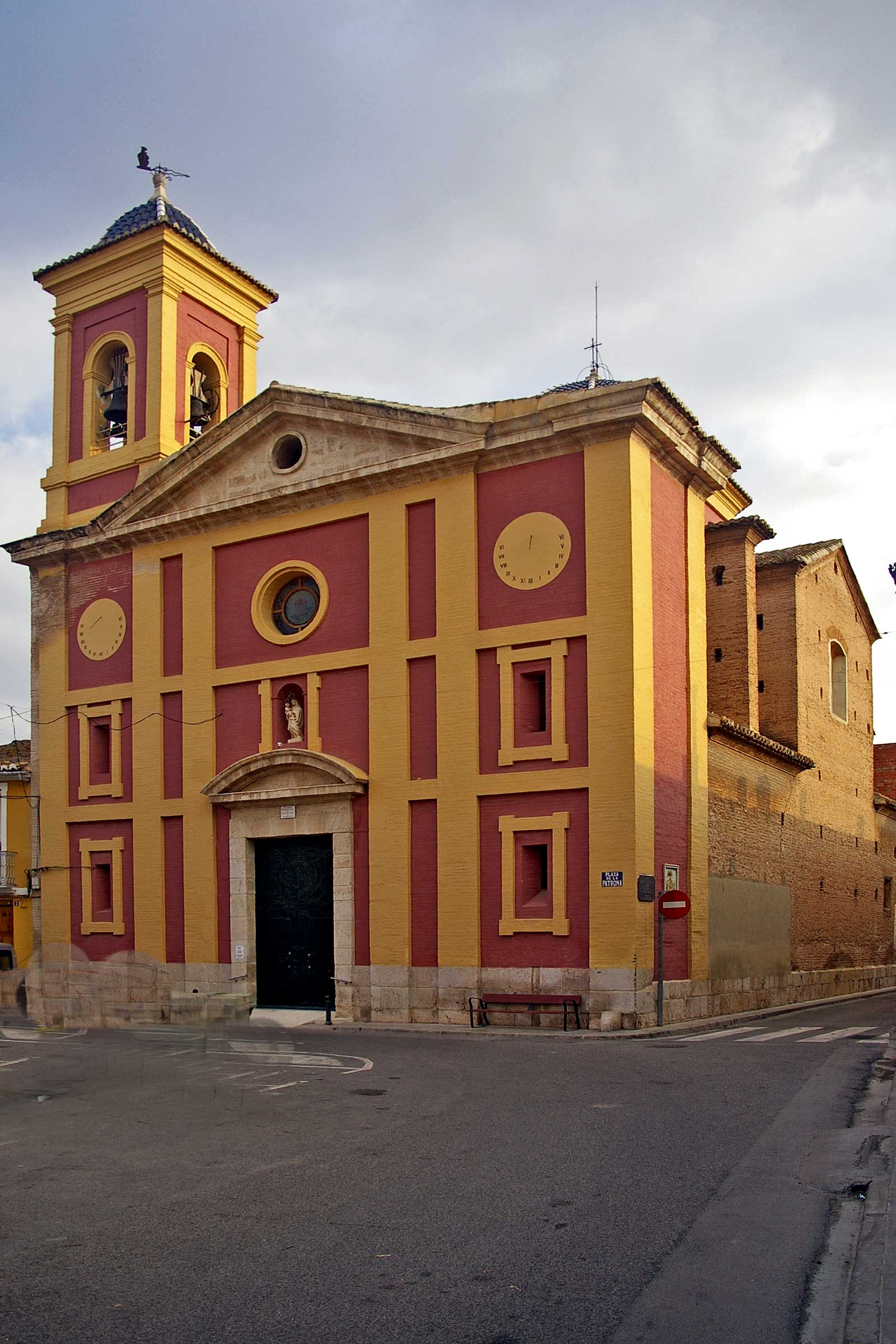
- Interactive map of Borbotó
- Country: Spain
- Province: Valencia
- Municipality: Valencia
- Elevation: 22 m (72 ft)

Population (2022)
  - Total: 734

Borbotó is the name of a hamlet in the city of Valencia, Spain, belonging to the district of Poblados del Norte, located in the northern part of the city. It borders Burjasot and Godella to the west, Carpesa to the east, Masarrochos, Moncada, and Benifaraig to the north, and Pueblo Nuevo to the south. Its population as of 2022 was 734 inhabitants. It was a village until 1888, when it became a hamlet of Valencia.
