= Albentosa =

- municipality
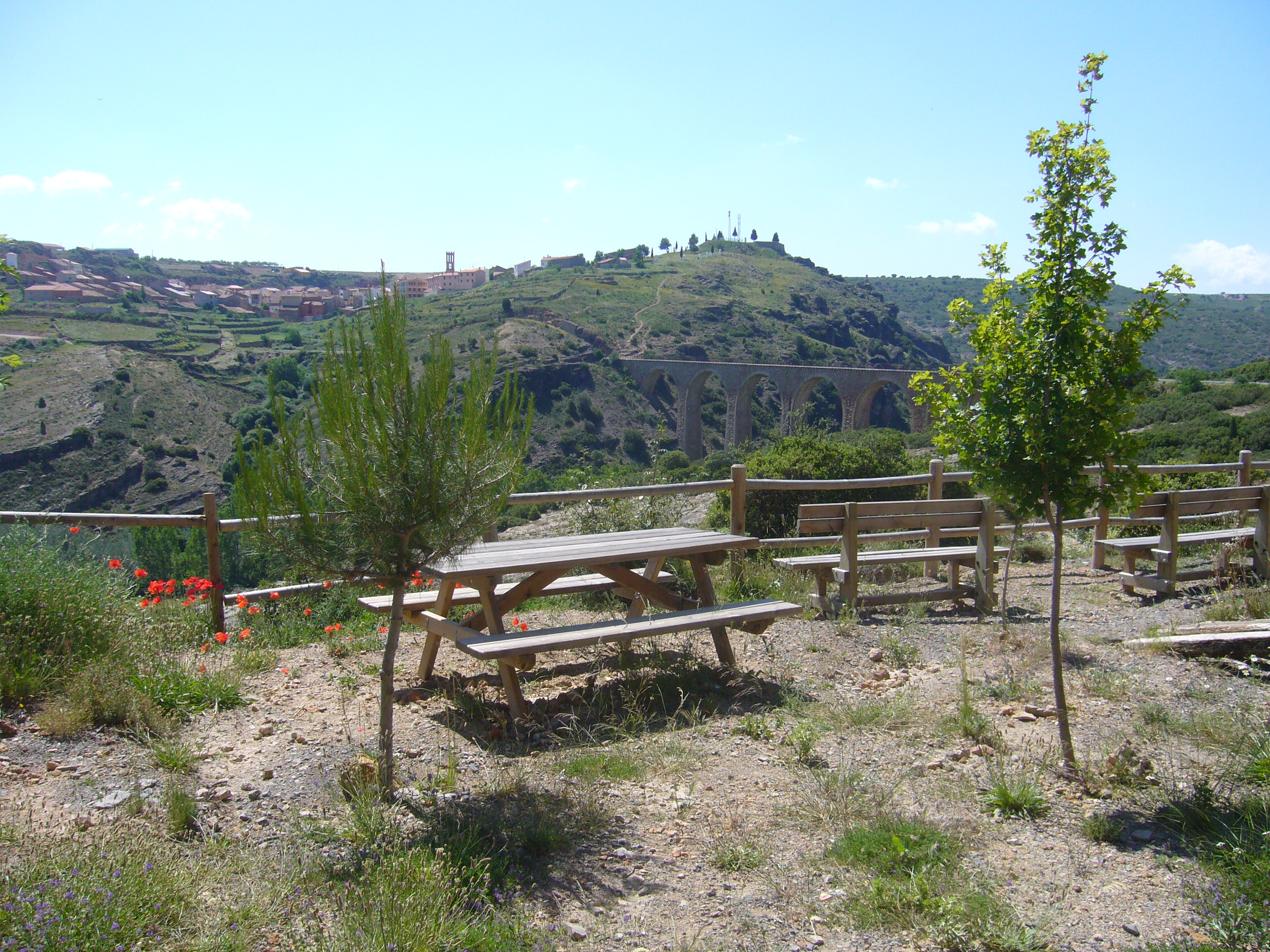

- Location within Spain
- Coordinates: 40°6′N 0°46′W
- Country: Spain
- Autonomous community: Aragon
- Province: Teruel

Area
  - Total: 68 km^{2} (26 sq mi)
- Elevation: 952 m (3,123 ft)

Population (2025-01-01)
  - Total: 290
  - Density: 4.3/km^{2} (11/sq mi)
- Time zone: UTC+1 (CET)
  - Summer (DST): UTC+2 (CEST)

Albentosa is a municipality located in the province of Teruel, Aragon, Spain. According to the 2007 census (INE), the municipality has a population of 334 inhabitants.

== See also ==
- List of municipalities in Teruel
