= Vistabella (Tarragona) =

Coordinates: 41°12′36″N 1°15′57″E

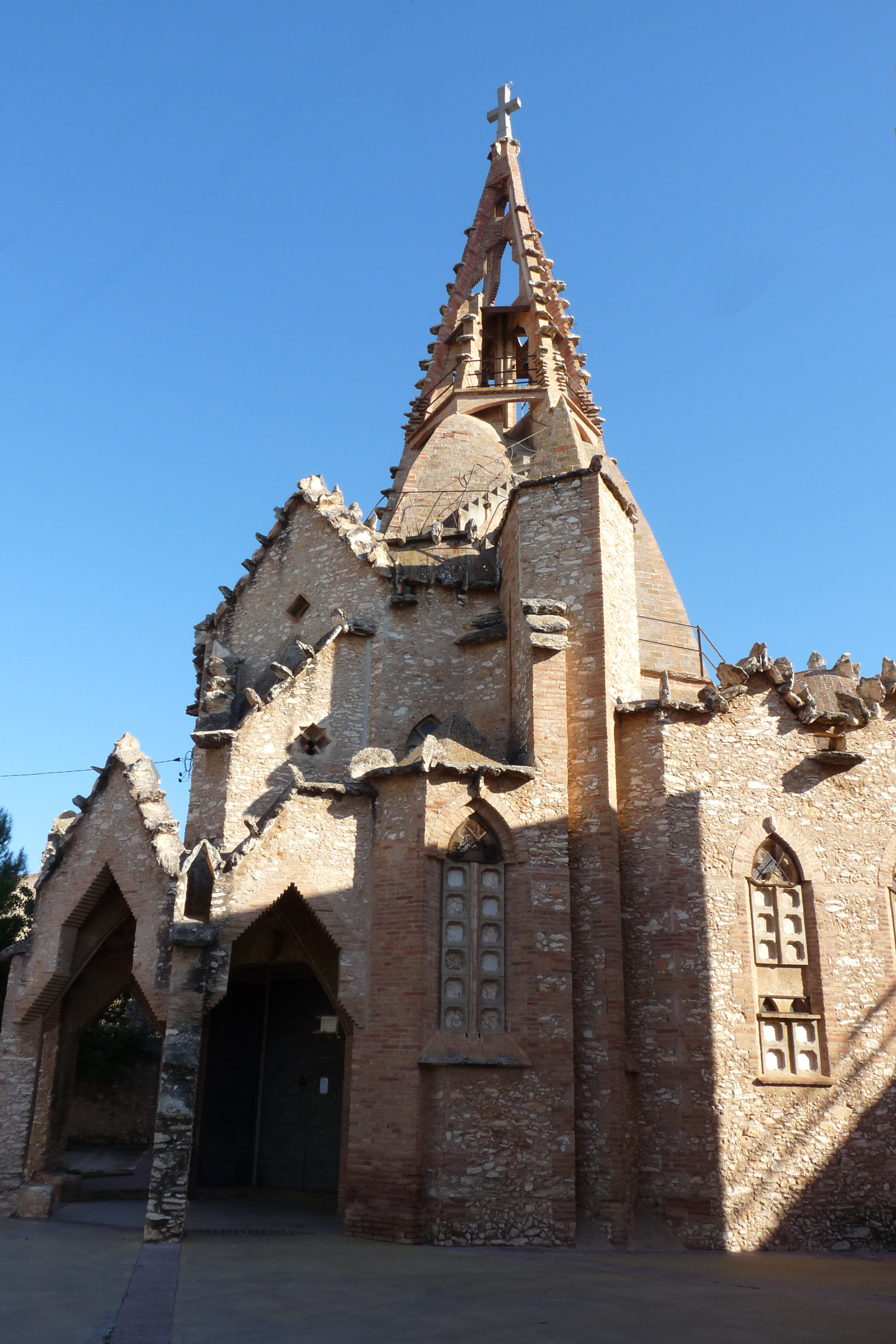
Iglesia del Sagrat Cor en Vistabella

Vistabella (full name Vistabella del Camp) is a village of 148 inhabitants (INE 2008), located north-west of the municipality of La Secuita, in the province of Tarragona.

It started off as a stable area forming a part of the municipal area of El Codony, which was separated from the domain of the Santes Creus Monastery. In any case, in 1298 half of the tithes and the local novelties went to the archbishop and the chapter of Tarragona, and the half to the stated monastery.

It boasts a small, lovely Modernista (art nouveau) church by Josep Maria Jujol (Sacred Heart Church, 1923).

Vistabella celebrates its Festa Major (annual town festivities) on or around Saint Bartholomew's Day (August 24th). Some years ago it also used to celebrate a Winter Festa Major on the Epiphany, January 6th. Every year during the Festa Major there is a ping pong championship at the Casal Jujol civic center that attracts participants from the surrounding towns.

The inhabitants are called vistabellencs in Catalan.
