= Masarrochos =

Coordinates: 39°32′23″N 0°24′15″W

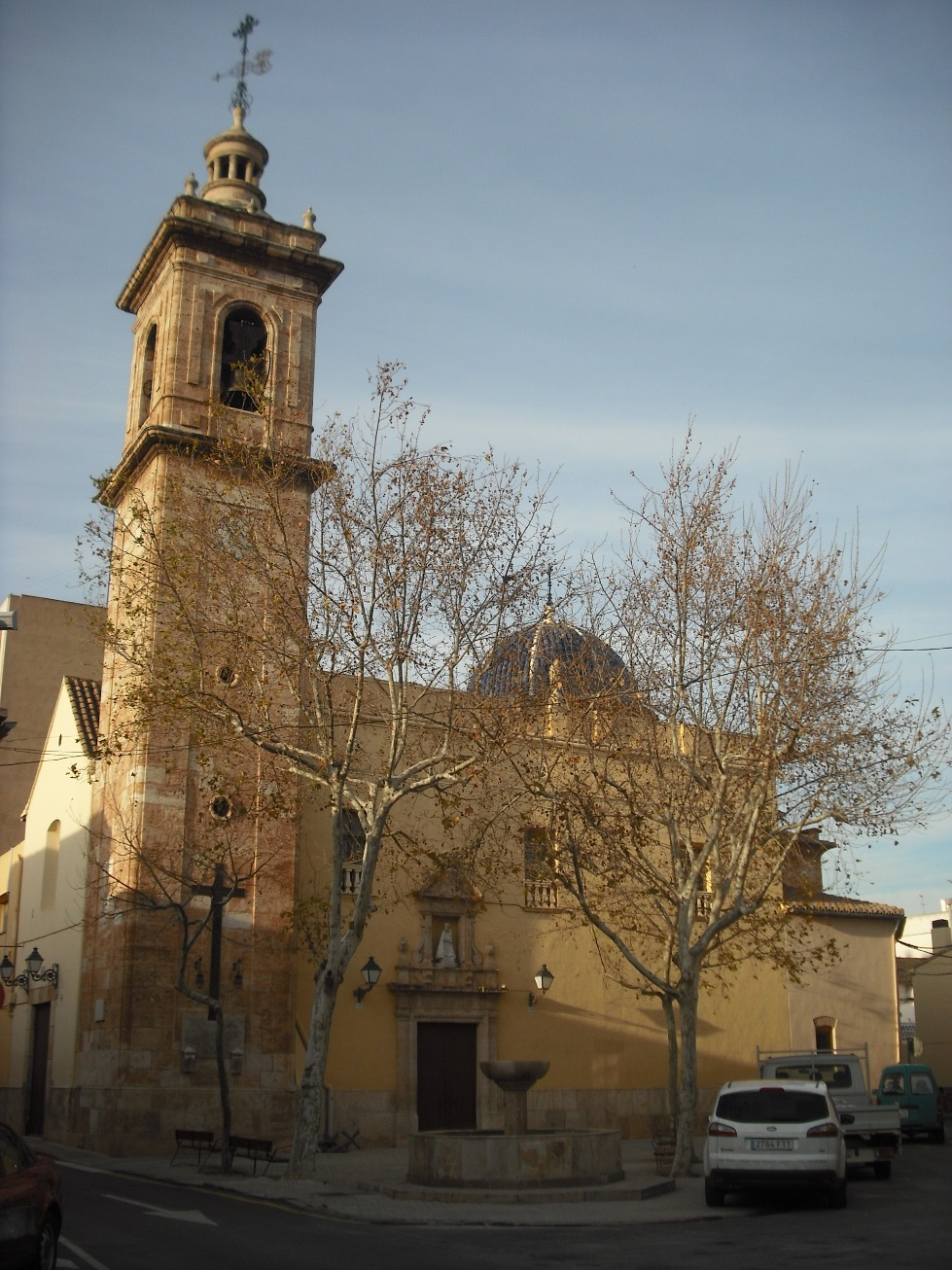
The church of Massarrojos

Masarrochos is a village in the district Pobles del Nord in the municipality of Valencia, Spain. The locality has a population of 2,319.
