= Casas de Bárcena =

Coordinates: 39.5050°N 0.3836°W

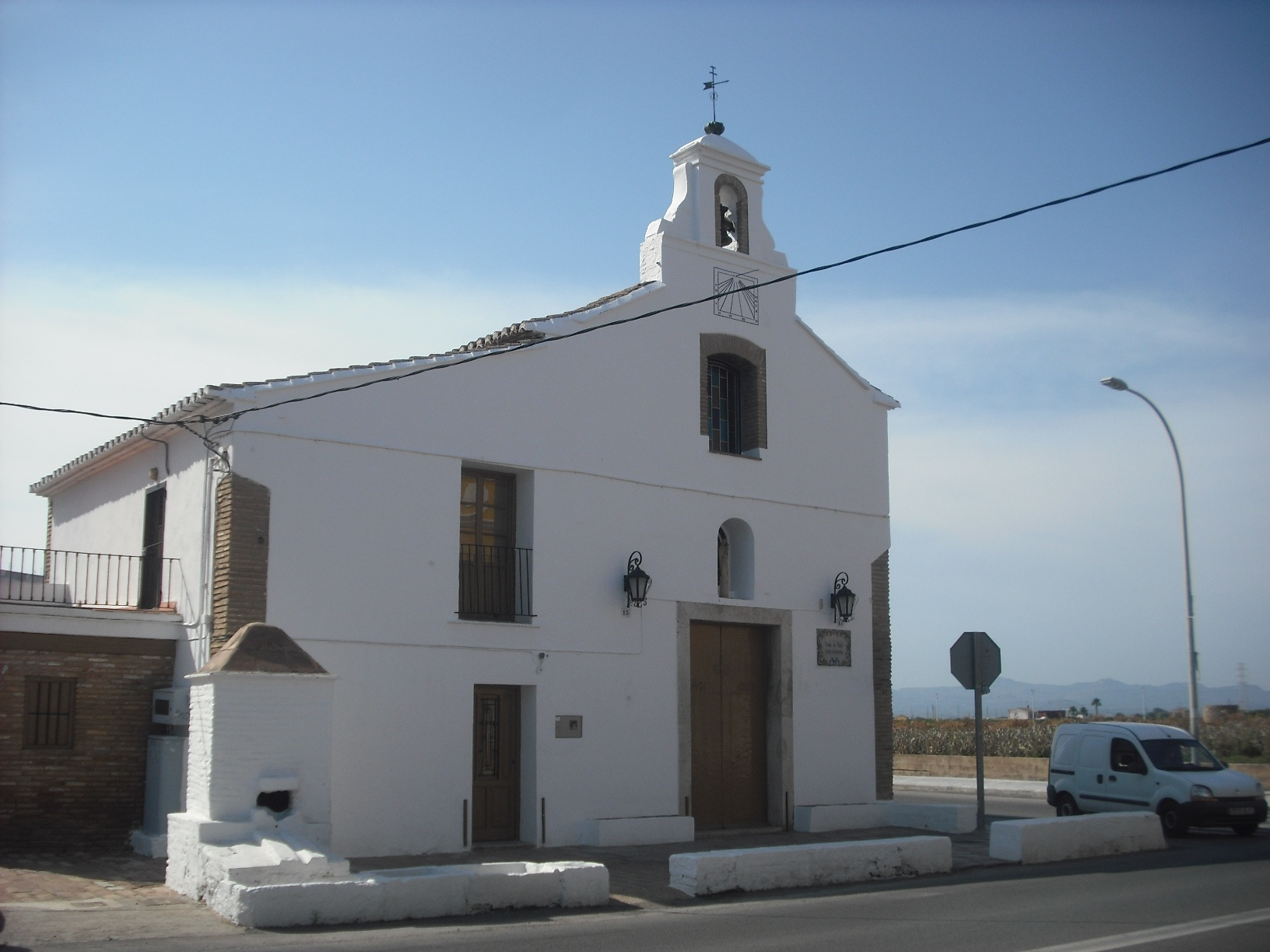
- Interactive map of Casas de Bárcena
- Country: Spain
- Province: Valencia
- Municipality: Valencia
- Elevation: 27 m (89 ft)

Population (2009)
  - Total: 398

Casas de Bárcena (Valencian: Cases de Bàrcena) is a village in the Valencian Community, Spain, part of the municipality of Valencia.
