= Autovía V-21 =

Motorway in Spain

Autovía V-21
- Autovía de Acceso Norte a Valencia
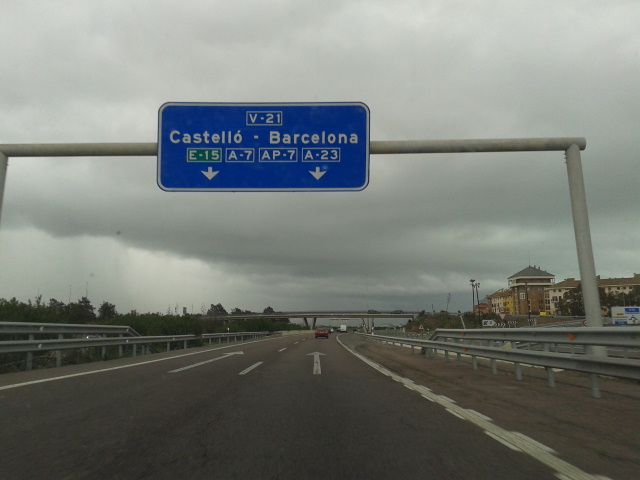

Route information
- Length: 18.32 km (11.38 mi)

Major junctions
- From: Puçol
- To: Valencia

Location
- Country: Spain

Highway system
- Highways in Spain; Autopistas and autovías; National Roads

The Autovía V-21 or Autovía de Acceso Norte a Valencia (Valencia North Access Autovía) is a Spanish autovía located in the province of Valencia. It travels from the A-7 to Valencia City. It is managed by the Government of Spain, and has a length of 18.32 kilometres (11.38 mi).
