= Battle of Valencia (1130) =

- Part of Reconquista
Date	May 1130
Location	Valencia
Result	Almoravid victory

Belligerents
Almoravids	Kingdom of Aragon

Commanders and leaders
Yintan bin al-Lamtuni	Gaston of Béarn †; Stephen of Huesca †

Strength
Unknown	Unknown

Casualties and losses
Unknown	Heavy

The Battle of Valencia in 1130 was a military engagement between the Almoravids and the Aragonese near Valencia. The Almoravids were victorious.

== Background ==
After the Almoravids took the Lordship of Valencia from the widow of El Cid in 1102, the Muslims held the fortified city and commanded the territory without major incursions from Alfonso the Battler, King of Aragón and Pamplona for over two decades.

Although Alfonso passed through the region in 1125-26 when he led a campaign to Granda to free the Mozarab Christians, no territory was taken. In the spring of 1129, however, Alfonso turned his attention back toward the Mediterranean coast, traveled into Sharq al-Andalus, and besieged the city of Valencia. The siege was interrupted in June, however, and ultimately ended after Alfonso and an Almoravid relief army fought a bloody battle in Montserrat near the Castle of the Alcalans.

== The battle ==
Approximately one year later in May 1130 while Alfonso the Battler was campaigning north of the Pyrenees to protect the Val d'Aran, he sent two of his leading military and diplomatic deputies back to Sharq al-Andalus to continue to challenge the Almoravids.

Leading the Argonese force were Gaston of Béarn and the Bishop Stephen of Huesca. After news of the raid reached the city, Yintan bin al-Lamtuni, the energetic governor of Valencia, left the city with his army to intercept and confront the Christians. The armies clashed near the city and the Almoravids defeated the invaders. Both Gaston and Stephen of Huesca died on the battlefield. Gaston's body was found, his head was cut off and ultimately sent first, to the city of Granada to be paraded through the streets on a spear, and later sent to Marrakesh.

== Aftermath ==
The death of the two Argonese leaders was a significant loss to Alfonso the Battler. To protect his kingdom from the Almoravids, Alfonso hastily returned to fortify his borders. Ultimately Alfonso was forced to enter into a treaty with the Almoravids. Yintan, for his effort, was rewarded with the governorship of Seville.
