= Siege of Valencia =

Siege of Valencia may refer to:

- Siege of Valencia (1065), a siege during the reign of Ferdinand I of León and Castile
- Siege of Valencia (1086)
- Siege of Valencia (1087)
- Siege of Valencia (1092–1094)
- Siege of Valencia (1101–1102)
- Conquest of Valencia (1238)
- Siege of Valencia (1359)
- Siege of Valencia (1363)
- Siege of Valencia (1364)
- Siege of Valencia (1808)
- Siege of Valencia (1812)

== See also ==
- Battle of Valencia
