= Ibn Alqama (disambiguation) =

Ibn Alqama (also Ibn Alkama, Bin Alqamah, etc.) may refer to:

- Abu Ya'fur ibn Alqama (fl. early 6th century), Lakhmid general
- Abu Haritha bin Alqamah (fl. early 7th century), bishop of Najran
- Sa'id ibn Yazid ibn Alqama al-Azdi, governor of Egypt in 682–684
- Abu Ghalib Tammam ibn Alkama (fl. 8th–9th century), Umayyad general in Spain
- Tammam ibn Alkama al-Wazir (fl. 9th century), Umayyad poet
- Ibn Alqama (d. 1116), Valencian historian

== See also ==
- Alqama (disambiguation)
