= Battle of Valencia =

Battle of Valencia may refer to:

- Battle of Valencia (1130) during the Reconquista
- Battle of Valencia de Alcántara (1762), an engagement during the Spanish invasion of Portugal
- Battle of Valencia (1808) during the Peninsular War
- Siege of Valencia (1812) during the Peninsular War
- Battle of Valencia (cultural), a conflict about the identity of the Valencian people and the Land of Valencia symbols during Spanish democratic transition in the 1970s and 1980s

== See also ==
- Siege of Valencia
