= La Puebla de Montalbán =

- Municipality
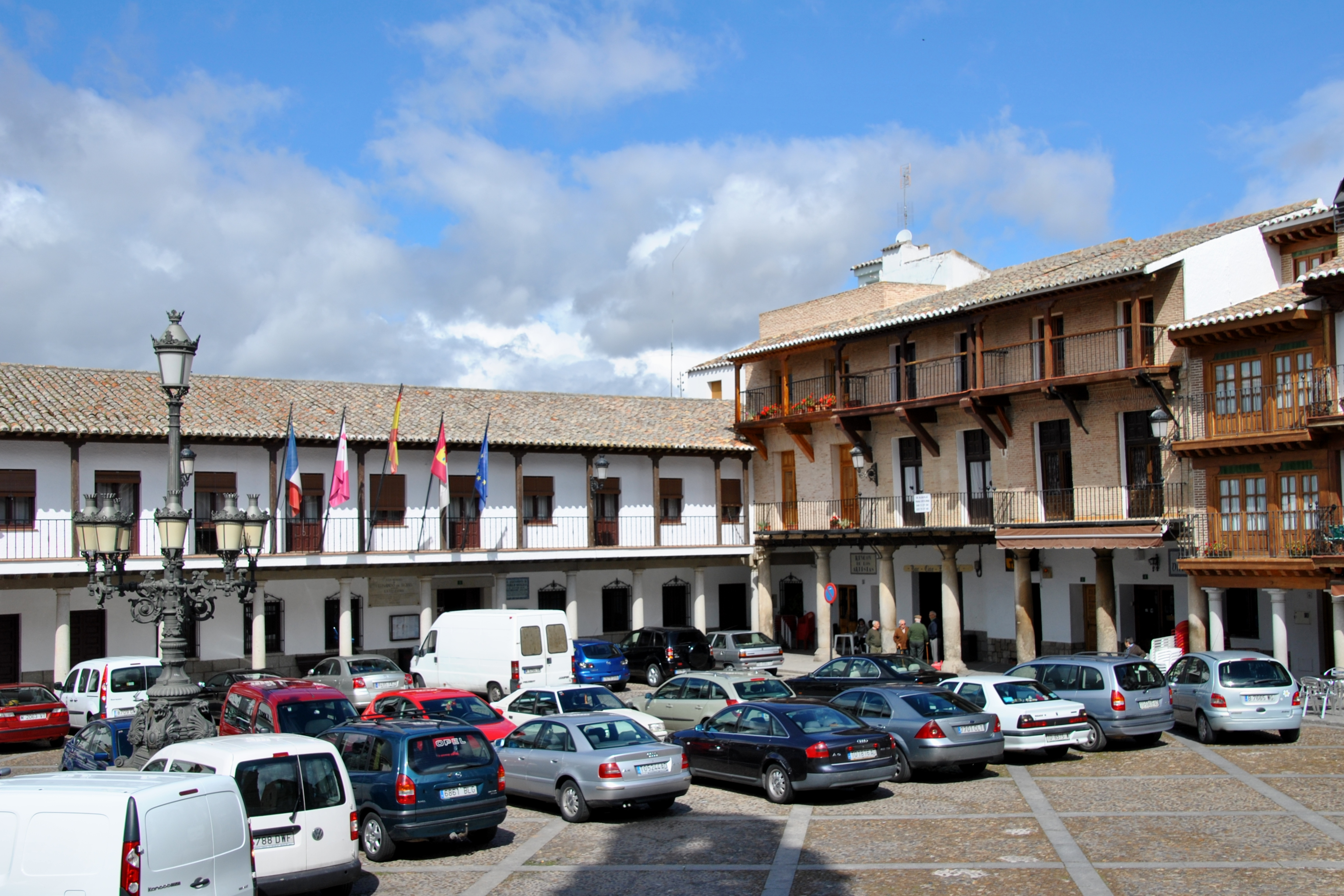
- Plaza Mayor

- Flag Coat of arms

- Location within Castilla-La Mancha Location within Spain
- Coordinates: 39°52′20″N 4°21′32″W
- Country: Spain
- Autonomous community: Castilla–La Mancha
- Province: Toledo
- Founded: Ver texto

Area
  - Total: 141.16 km^{2} (54.50 sq mi)
- Elevation: 453 m (1,486 ft)

Population (2025-01-01)
  - Total: 8,144
  - Density: 57.69/km^{2} (149.4/sq mi)
- Demonym(s): Pueblano, na Puebleño, ña
- Time zone: UTC+1 (CET)
  - Summer (DST): UTC+2 (CEST)
- Postal code: 45516
- Dialing code: 925
- Website: Official website

La Puebla de Montalbán is a Spanish town and municipality in the province of Toledo, in the autonomous community of Castilla–La Mancha.

== History ==
The settlement may have developed upon the extinction of the Templar commandery of Montalbán after 1312 and the transfer of its territory to the Fernández Coronel family. Whatever the case, La Puebla had emerged as the most important settlement of the aforementioned territory by 1387. A Jewish aljama already existed in the place by the second half of the 14th century. La Puebla received a weekly market right under the reign of John II. The bridge over the Tagus held notability as a part of the Cañada Real Segoviana livestock route, as it was annually passed through by a large number of transhumant sheep belonging to the Mesta. The settlement of La Rinconada de Tajo, located in the left (southern) bank of the Tagus and belonging to the municipality, was founded under Francoism as a pueblo de colonización towards the 1950s.

== Government ==
The mayor of La Puebla de Montalbán is Juan José García Rodríguez, of the ruling Partido Socialista Obrero Español. The Partido Socialista Obrero has six municipal councillors in the town's ayuntamiento, the Partido Popular has six and an independent group has one. In the 2004 Spanish General Election, the Partido Popular got 53.4% of the vote in La Puebla de Montalbán, the Partido Socialista Obrero Español got 48.6% and Izquierda Unida got 1.6%.

== Notable citizens ==
- Fernando de Rojas (c. 1465/73 - 1541), author of Comedia de Calisto y Melibea, usually called La Celestina.
- Rodrigo González (c. 1450 – April 1509) Spanish Ambassador who negotiated the marriage of Catherine of Aragon and Prince Arthur Tudor.
- Francisco Hernández de Toledo (ca. 1514-1517 - 1587), botanist and King Philip II's doctor.
- Pedro Pacheco de Villena (died 1560), Bishop of Siguenza, Cardinal Bishop of Albano, participant in the Council of Trent.
- Andrés Pacheco (1550 - 1626), Franciscan and Roman Catholic Cardinal
- Luis Carrillo de Toledo (1564 - 1626), general and statesman.
- Enrique Dávila Pacheco (15?? - 1663), an administrator in certain Spanish new world colonies.
- Ángel Luis Ruiz Paz (born 1987), footballer
- Álvaro Rico (born 1996), actor
