= Battle of Alcalá (1129) =

Battle between Almoravid and Aragonese forces

Coordinates: 39°19′44″N 0°35′07″W

- Part of the Reconquista
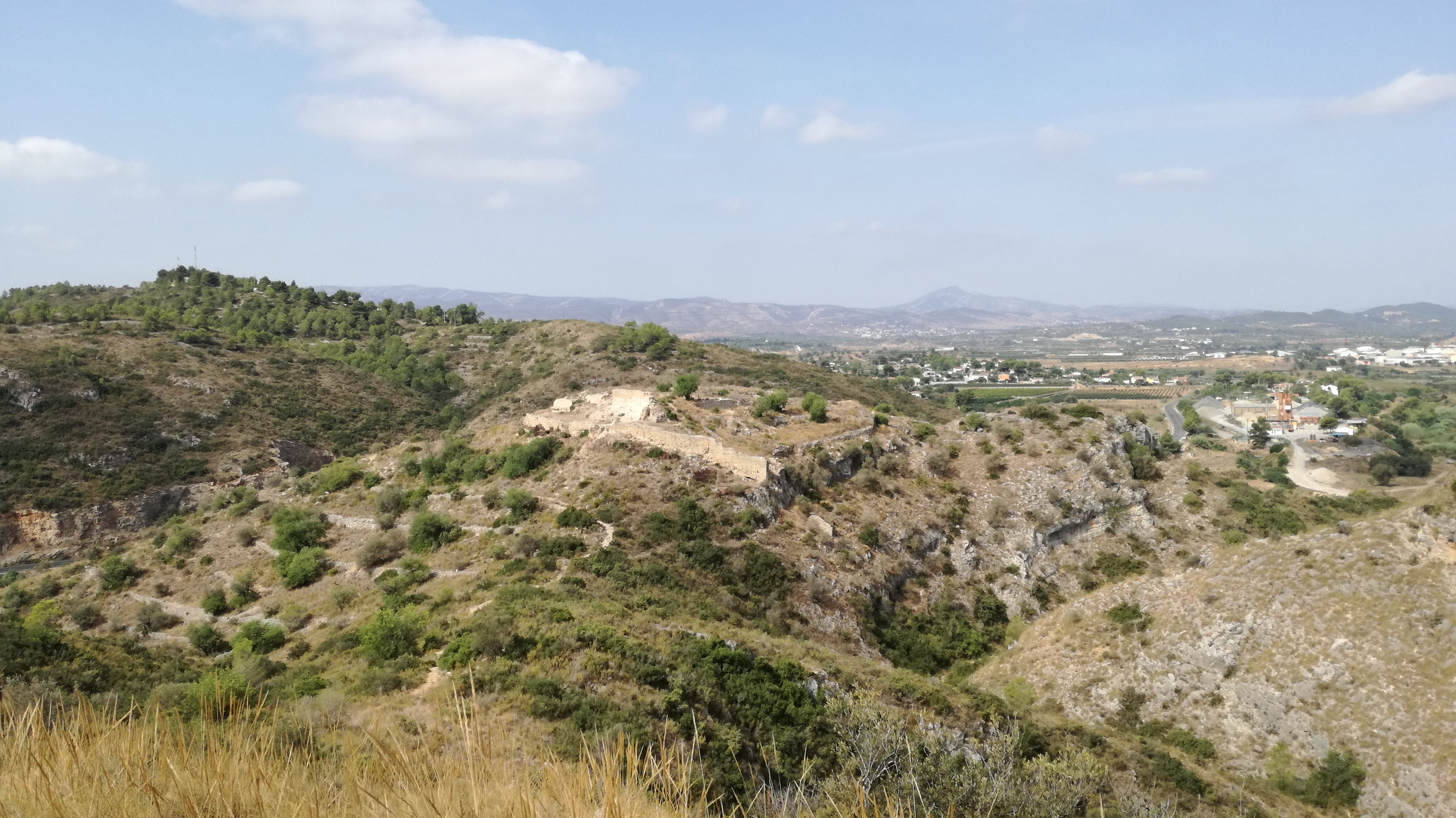
- The Castle of the Alcalans southeast of Montserrat
| Date | June 1129 |
| Location | Montserrat, Valencia |
| Result | Aragonese victory |

Belligerents
| Kingdom of Aragon; Kingdom of Pamplona | Almoravids |

Commanders and leaders
| Alfonso the Battler | Ali ibn Majjuz |

Strength
| Unknown | Unknown |

Casualties and losses
| Unknown | 12,000 killed or captured |

The Battle of Alcalá or Battle of Cullera was fought near the castle of the Alcalans between Alfonso the Battler, King of Aragón and Pamplona, and the Almoravids in June 1129.

== Background ==
After the Almoravids took the Lordship of Valencia from the widow of El Cid in 1102, the Muslims held the fortified city and commanded the territory without major incursions from Alfonson the Battler for over two decades.

Although Alfonso passed through the region in 1125-26 when he led a campaign to Granda to free the Mozarab Christians, no territory was taken. In 1129, however, Alfonso turned his attention back toward the Mediterranean coast to re-establish Christian control over Valencia.

== The battle ==
In the spring of 1129, Alfonso led his army into Sharq al-Andalus and besieged the city of Valencia. When this occurred, the Almoravids assembled an army to “hunt him down” and relieve the city. The Almoravid army tasked with relieving Valencia was composed of newly arrived forces from Morocco together with African horsemen led by the governor of Seville. When Alfonson learned of the approach of the Almoravid army, he chose not to remain in place for fear that he would be trapped between the garrison at Valencia and the relief army advancing from the south.

As a result, Alfonso took the bulk of his army and traveled south from Valencia to intercept the relief Muslin force. The two armies ultimately confronted each other in the Magro River valley southeast of Montserrat near the Almoravid military outpost at the Castle of the Alcalans. The location of the battle ended up serving Alfonso well in that the rugged terrain slowed the speed and the effectiveness of the Almoravid light cavalry.

The battle was a decisive victory for Alfonso the Battler. After the battle, Alfonso and his army returned to the besieged city of Valencia. Ultimately, however, Alfonso ended the siege suggesting either that he no longer had enough resources to continue or that he needed to address more urgent affairs on his northern borders.

== Aftermath ==
According to the Valencian-Muslim poet Ibn al-Abbar, the disastrous defeat of the Almoravids caused them to lose interest in the Sharq al-Andalus region and would lead to the proclamation of a second wave of taifa kingdoms in Sharq al-Andalusia.
