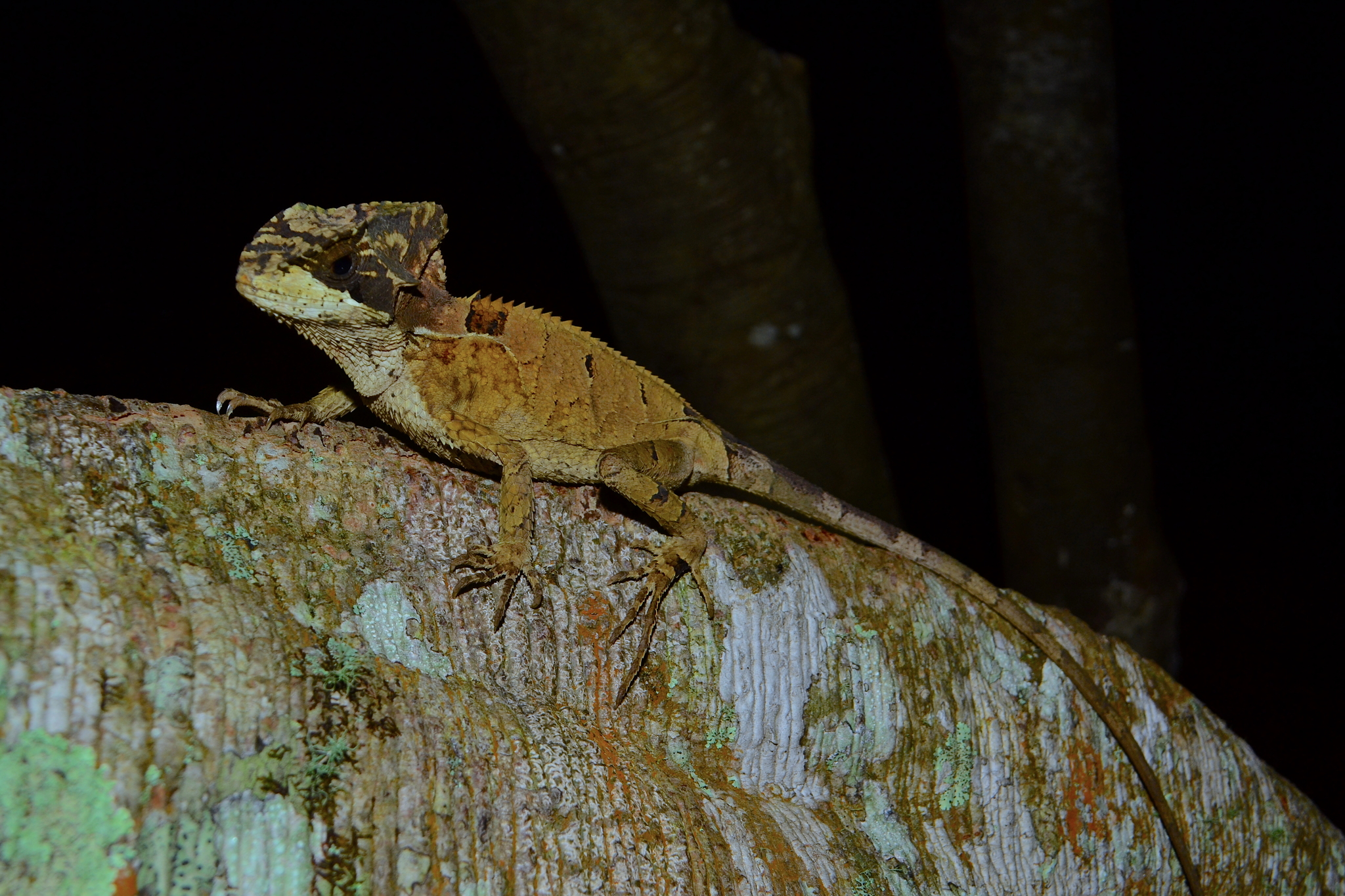

Conservation status
- Least Concern (IUCN 3.1)

Scientific classification
- Kingdom: Animalia
- Phylum: Chordata
- Class: Reptilia
- Order: Squamata
- Suborder: Iguania
- Family: Corytophanidae
- Genus: Corytophanes
- Species: C. hernandesii

Binomial name
- Corytophanes hernandesii (Wiegmann in Gray, 1831)

Synonyms
- Chamœleopsis Hernandesii Wiegmann in Gray, 1831; Corytophanes chamaeleopsis A.M.C. Duméril & Bibron, 1837 (nomen substitutum); Corytophanes hernandesii — Fitzinger, 1843; Corythophanes chamaeleopsis — Sumichrast, 1864; Corytophanes hernandesii — Boulenger, 1885

= Corytophanes hernandesii =

Species of lizard

Corytophanes hernandesii, also known commonly as Hernandez's helmeted basilisk and el turipache de montaña in Spanish, is a species of lizard in the family Corytophanidae. The species is native to Central America and southern Mexico.

A Hernandez's helmeted basilisk at a reptile expo in Las Vegas.

== Etymology ==
The specific name, hernandesii, is in honor of Spanish naturalist Francisco Hernández (1514–1587).

== Geographic range ==
C. hernandesii is found in Belize, Guatemala, and Honduras, and in the southern Mexican states of Campeche, Chiapas, Oaxaca, Puebla, Quintana Roo, San Luis Potosí, Veracruz, and Yucatán.

== Habitat ==
The preferred natural habitat of C. hernandesii is forest, at altitudes from sea level to 1,300 m (4,300 ft).

== Behavior ==
C. hernandesii is diurnal and mostly arboreal.

== Reproduction ==
C. hernandesii is oviparous.
