= Ibn Alqama =

Andalusi Muslim official and historian

Abū ʿAbd Allāh Muḥammad ibn al-Khālaf, called Ibn ʿAlqāmā (Note: Also spelled Ibn ʿAlḳama or Ibn Alcama.) (1036/37–1116 AD [428–509 AH]), was an Andalusi Muslim official and historian.

A native of the city of Valencia, he wrote a history of the fall of the city to the Christian army of El Cid in 1094 under the title Clear Exposition of the Disastrous Tragedy. (Note: The title may also be translated as Eloquent Evidence of the Great Calamity.) He may have completed it before the death of El Cid in 1099, or as late as 1110. It is a lost work that can be partially reconstructed only from excerpts in other works, primarily that of Ibn ʿIdhārī. On one reconstruction it covers the period from September 1092 until May 1102, including the recapture of Valencia after El Cid's death. It is also excerpted in Ibn al-Khaṭīb, and found its way into several Christian chronicles: the Estoria de España, Crónica geral de Espanha de 1344, Tercera crónica general, Crónica de los reyes de Castilla, Crónica de veinte reyes and Crónica particular del Cid.

Ibn ʿAlqāmā was a partisan of the Almoravids. He writes with pathos and clearly detests all agreements between the Valencians and the Christians. His account is lively, as well as detailed to the point of triviality. Partial reconstructions of his work based on excerpts in Christian and Muslim chronicles, respectively, were made by Ramón Menéndez Pidal in 1929. He believed that the Christian sources preserved more and better information from Ibn ʿAlqāmā than the Muslim chronicles, and tried to tease it out accordingly. His position is not now widely accepted. In 1948, Évariste Lévi-Provençal provided an edition of the Arabic excerpts with a French translation, which was later also translated into Spanish.

Ibn ʿAlqāmā died in Dénia in 1116.
