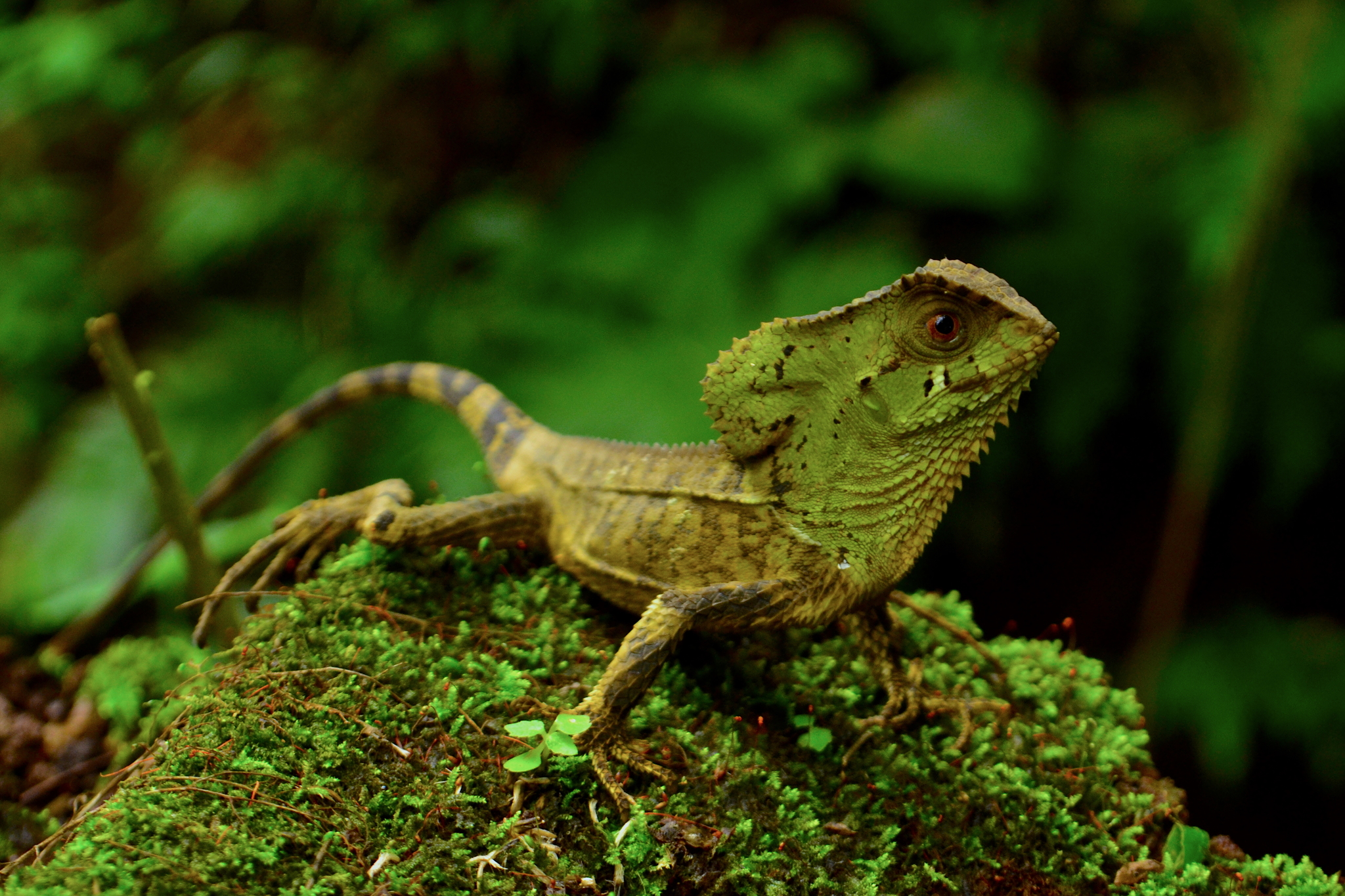

Conservation status
- Least Concern (IUCN 3.1)

Scientific classification
- Kingdom: Animalia
- Phylum: Chordata
- Class: Reptilia
- Order: Squamata
- Suborder: Iguania
- Family: Corytophanidae
- Genus: Corytophanes
- Species: C. percarinatus

Binomial name
- Corytophanes percarinatus A.H.A. Duméril, 1856

= Guatemalan helmeted basilisk =

Species of lizard

The Guatemalan helmeted basilisk (Corytophanes percarinatus) is a species of lizard in the family Corytophanidae. The species is native to Central America and southern Mexico.

== Geographic range ==
C. percarinatus is found in El Salvador, Guatemala, Honduras, and southern Mexico (Chiapas).

== Common names ==
Other common names for C. percarinatus include keeled helmeted basilisk, keeled helmeted iguana, and turipache de hojarasca in Spanish.

== Habitat ==
The preferred natural habitats of C. percarinatus are forest and savanna, at altitudes of 200–2,000 m (660–6,560 ft).

== Reproduction ==
C. percarinatus is viviparous.
