= Crónica particular del Cid =

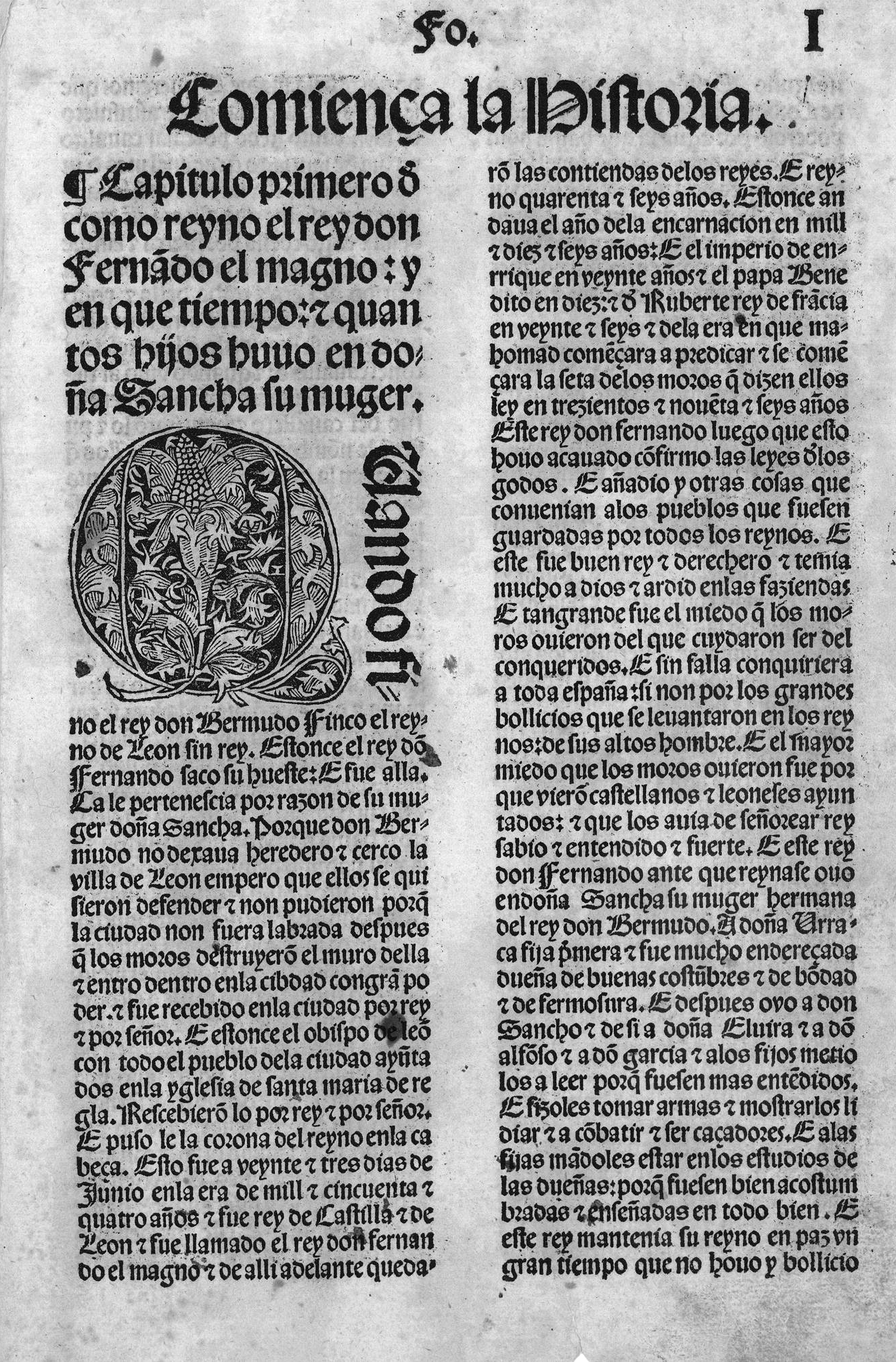
First page of the 1512 printing

The Crónica del famoso cavallero Cid Ruy Díez Campeador, commonly called the Crónica particular del Cid, is a 15th-century Spanish biography of El Cid.

Juan de Velorado, abbot of San Pedro de Cardeña, made an edition of the Crónica from a single manuscript (now BNE, MS 1810) and had it printed at Burgos by Fadrique Alemán de Basilea in 1512. It was reprinted in 1552 and 1593. All three printings coincided with formal requests to have the Cid canonized as a saint.

The Crónica's main text is derived from the first part of the Crónica de los reyes de Castilla (c. 1300) covering the reigns of Ferdinand I through Alfonso VI. Velorado added appendices containing the Cid's genealogy and a description of the tombs of San Pedro, including the Cid's. The texts of two epitaphs, one in Latin and another of epic character in Spanish, are included. The Crónica particular is the earliest source to specify the day of the Cid's death as 10 July, although it gets the year wrong (1098 rather than 1099). It is possible that Velorado had access to a now lost necrology.

In its emphases, the Crónica takes the form of a military treatise imbued with hagiographic overtones by the abbot. The preparation of the 1512 edition may have been inspired by the visit of Prince Ferdinand to the monastery and intended for his moral and knightly education.
