= Fernando de Rojas =

Spanish author and playwright (c. 1470–1541)

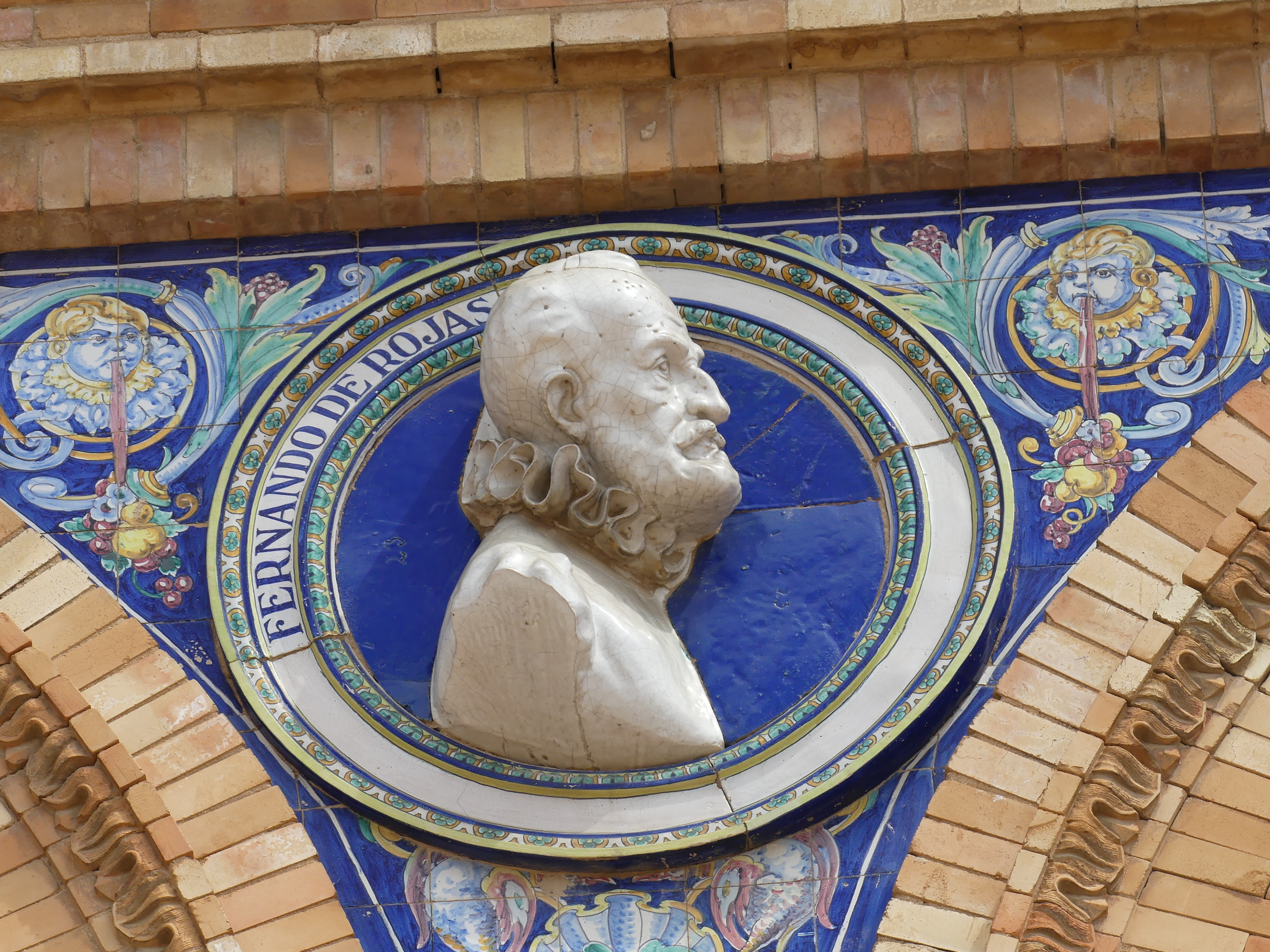

Mayor of Talavera de la Reina, 1530s

Personal details
- Born: c. 1465/73 La Puebla de Montalbán, Toledo, Spain
- Died: April , 1541 (aged 67-68 or 75-76) Talavera de la Reina, Toledo, Spain
- Spouse: Leonor Álvarez de Montalbán
- Children: 7
- Education: University of Salamanca
- Occupation: Author, dramatist, lawyer
- Known for: Writing La Celestina (1499)

Fernando de Rojas (c. 1465/73, in La Puebla de Montalbán, Toledo, Spain – April 1541, in Talavera de la Reina, Toledo, Spain) was a Spanish author and dramatist, known for his only surviving work, La Celestina (originally titled Tragicomedia de Calisto y Melibea), first published in 1499. It is variously considered "the last work of the Spanish Middle Ages or the first work of the Spanish Renaissance".

Rojas wrote La Celestina while still a student. After graduating he practised law and is not known to have written any further literary works, although La Celestina achieved widespread success during his lifetime. Despite difficulties with the Inquisition, Rojas was a successful lawyer and became mayor of Talavera de la Reina, where he lived for the last three decades of his life.

== Life and career ==
Rojas was born at La Puebla de Montalbán, Toledo, to a family of Jewish descent. Contemporary documents refer to Rojas as "converso", but scholarly opinion differs on whether this means that he himself converted from Judaism to Christianity or whether the term implied that he was "de linaje de conversos" – of convert descent. Jewish descent was not a bar to social advancement, and Rojas's family had been recognised as hidalgos for at least three generations. Nevertheless, converso families lived under the shadow of the Inquisition and were vulnerable to accusations of secretly practising Judaism.

Rojas studied law at the University of Salamanca, graduating around 1498. While at the university he began writing La Celestina (originally titled Tragicomedia de Calisto y Melibea), which was published in 1499. The work has been variously described as a drama, a dramatic poem, a dialogued novel, a novel-drama, and as 'ageneric' – a genre entirely of its own. It was never staged during Rojas's lifetime, but the majority of modern scholars consider it a drama. It describes a love affair, with much bawdy and comic detail, before a tragic ending. The scholar Dorothy Severin has written that it may be considered as either the last Spanish work of the Middle Ages or the first of the Renaissance. As far as is known it is Rojas's only work of literature or drama. The writer Keith Gregor calls La Celestina "vastly influential" but "his only literary testament".

On returning to the family home after leaving the university Rojas found his relations under scrutiny from the Inquisition; he himself was never suspected of Judaism. Many conversos chose to marry into families of unquestioned Christian descent, and by Rojas's time many noble families were of mixed Christian and Jewish ancestry, as was Tomás de Torquemada, the first Grand Inquisitor of Spain. Rojas, however, married into another converso family. His wife was Leonor Álvarez de Montalbán. They had four sons and three daughters.

In about 1507 Rojas moved to the city of Talavera de la Reina, where he practiced law. When his father-in-law, Álvaro de Montalbán, was accused of secretly returning to Judaism in 1525, the Inquisition refused to allow Rojas to act as defending lawyer, but this was evidently on account of Rojas's status as a converso rather than from any suspicion that he might be secretly practicing Judaism. He was allowed to testify on Montalbán's behalf, and the charge was dropped. Rojas served as mayor of Talavera de la Reina in the 1530s.

The writer Gordon Campbell observes that during Rojas's lifetime La Celestina achieved rapid success: "in the course of the sixteenth century some 60 editions and six sequels were published. Its sexual explicitness and amoral pessimism did not trouble the Spanish Inquisition, which was content simply to excise anticlerical passages."
