= Alqama =

Alqama, Alkama, ʿAlqama or ʿAlḳama may refer to:

- 'Alqama ibn 'Abada (fl. early 6th century), Arab poet
- Alqama ibn Qays (d. 681/2), Muslim scholar
- Alqama (8th century), Muslim general

== See also ==
- Ibn Alqama (disambiguation)
