= Castle of Montalbán =

Castle in the province of Toledo, Spain

Coordinates: 39°45′11″N 4°25′26″W

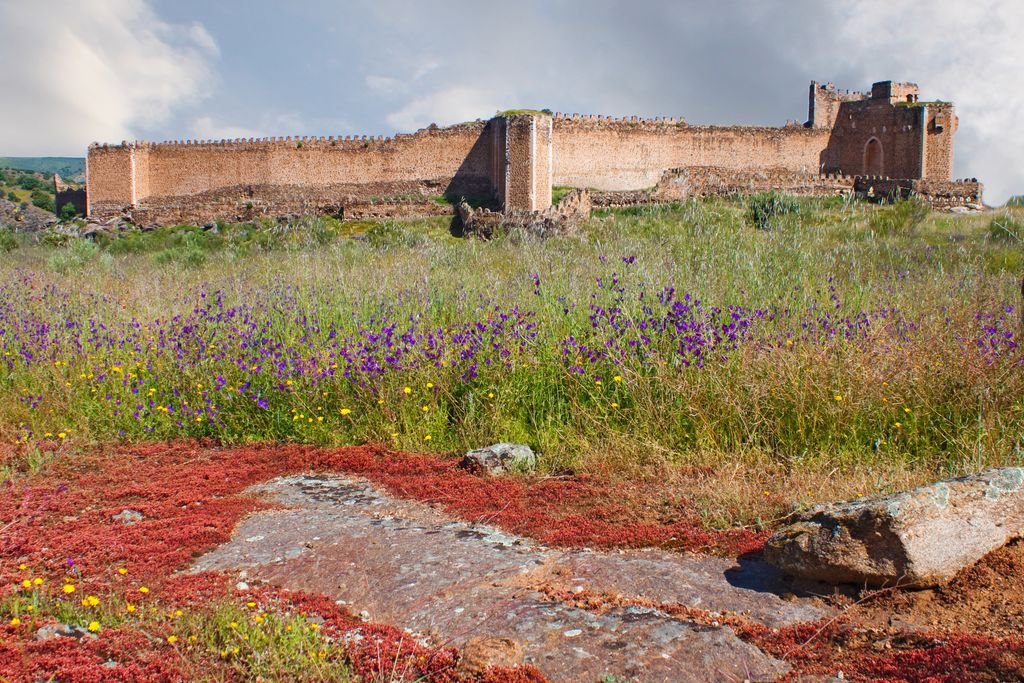
Castillo de montalban

The Castle of Montalban (Castillo de Montalbán) is a castle in San Martín de Montalbán, province of Toledo, Spain, that stands 100 metres above the Torcón river The castle has been owned by the Duchy of Osuna since the 15th century and was declared a historic monument in 1931. The Asociación Hispania Nostra has included the castle on the 'Lista Roja del Patrimonio', a list of historic heritage at risk.
