= Stephen Gilman =

American philologist (1917–1986)

- Born: 1917; Chicago, Illinois, US
- Died: November 23, 1986 (aged 68–69); Cambridge, Massachusetts, US

Academic background
- Education: Princeton University
- Thesis: A critical analysis of the "Quijote apocrifo" of Alonso Fernández de Avellaneda

Academic work
- Discipline: Hispanic studies
- Institutions: Harvard University; Ohio State University; Princeton University
- Main interests: La Celestina

Stephen Gilman (1917 – November 23, 1986) was an American Hispanist, known for his work on the 15th-century novel La Celestina.

== Biography ==
Gilman studied at Princeton University under Américo Castro and received his doctorate in 1943 with the work A critical analysis of the "Quijote apocrifo" of Alonso Fernández de Avellaneda (published in Spanish: "Cervantes y Avellaneda. Estudio de una imitación", Mexico City 1951, Ann Arbor 1987). After two years of military service, he was a Princeton assistant professor from 1946 to 1948. He went to Ohio State University in Columbus, Ohio and was first an associate professor, then a full professor from 1950 to 1956. For the academic year of 1950–51, he was a Guggenheim Fellow. From 1957 until his retirement in 1985, he taught at Harvard University as a professor of Romance languages. In 1961, he was elected to the American Academy of Arts and Sciences. He died on November 23, 1986, aged 68 or 69, in Cambridge, Massachusetts.

Gilman was the son-in-law of Jorge Guillén and the brother-in-law of Claudio Guillén.

== Selected publications ==
- The Art of “La Celestina”, Madison 1956, Westport 1976 (Spanish: La Celestina. Arte y estructura, Madrid 1974, 1992)
- Tiempos y formas temporales en el "Poema del Cid", Madrid 1961, 1969, Ann Arbor 1971, 1982
- The tower as emblem. Chapter VIII, IX, XIX and XX of the “Chartreuse de Parme”, Frankfurt am Main 1967
- The Spain of Fernando de Rojas. The intellectual and social landscape of “La Celestina”, Princeton 1972, 1976, 2015 e-book edition (Spanish: La España de Fernando de Rojas. Panorama intelectual y social de “La Celestina”, Madrid 1978)
- Galdós and the art of the European novel 1867-1887, Princeton 1981, 2014 e-book edition
- The novel according to Cervantes, Berkeley 1989
