= San Martín de Montalbán =

Coordinates: 39°42′N 4°23′W

San Martín de Montalbán, Spain
- Coat of arms
- Interactive map of San Martín de Montalbán, Spain
- Country: Spain
- Autonomous community: Castile-La Mancha
- Province: Toledo
- Municipality: San Martín de Montalbán

Area
  - Total: 135 km^{2} (52 sq mi)
- Elevation: 659 m (2,162 ft)

Population (2025-01-01)
  - Total: 778
  - Density: 5.76/km^{2} (14.9/sq mi)
- Time zone: UTC+1 (CET)
  - Summer (DST): UTC+2 (CEST)

San Martín de Montalbán is a municipality located in the province of Toledo, Castile-La Mancha, Spain. According to the 2006 census (INE), the municipality had a population of 748 inhabitants.

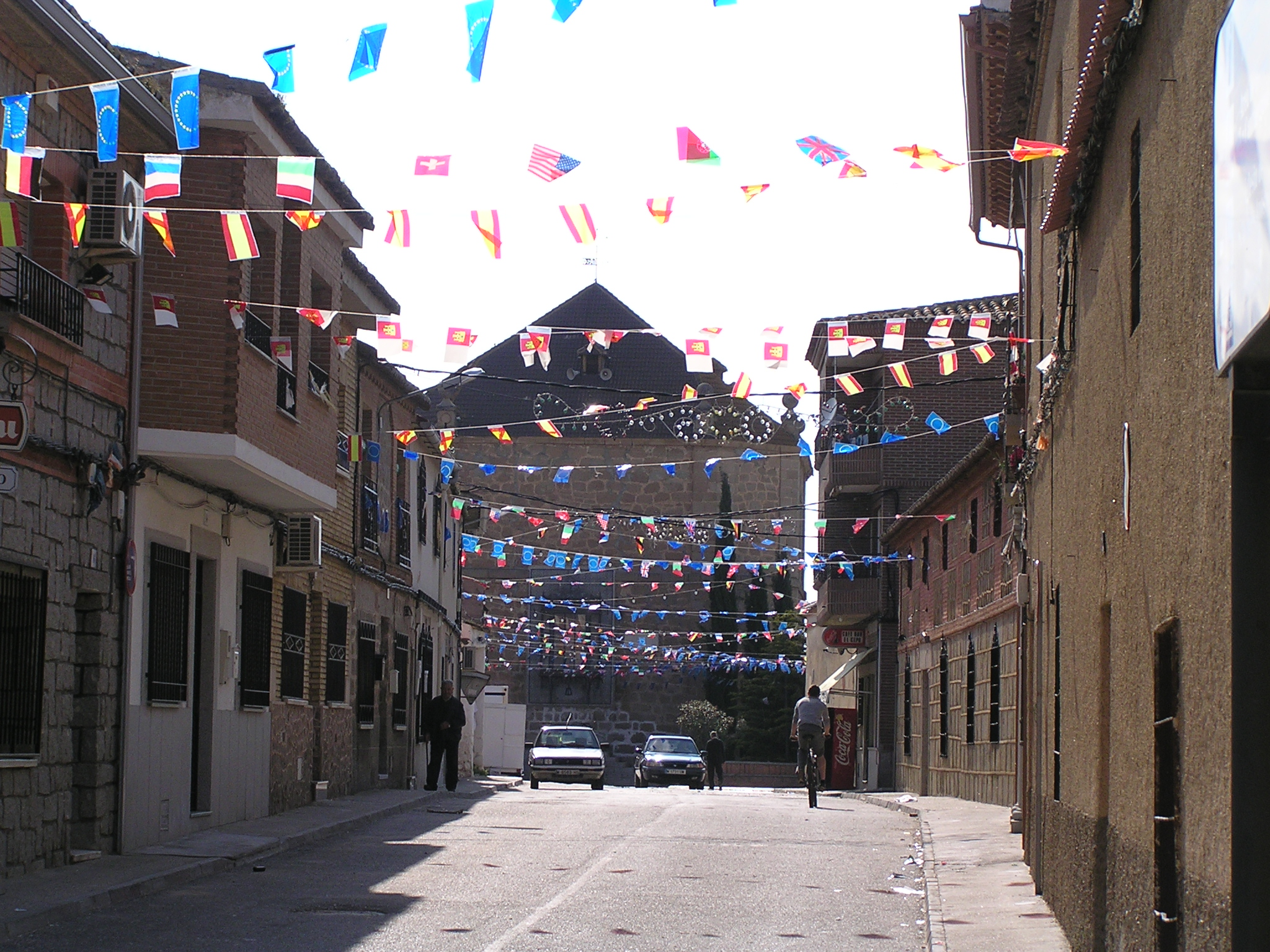
Entrance to the Plaza de San Martín de Montalbán

== Demographics ==
Historical population
Year	Pop.	±%
1900	1,252	—
1910	1,592	+27.2%
1920	1,652	+3.8%
1930	1,785	+8.1%
1940	1,710	−4.2%
1950	1,927	+12.7%
1960	1,681	−12.8%
1970	1,096	−34.8%
1981	898	−18.1%
1991	739	−17.7%
2001	739	+0.0%
2011	841	+13.8%
2021	725	−13.8%
2023	724	−0.1%
Source: INE
