= Fadrique de Basilea =

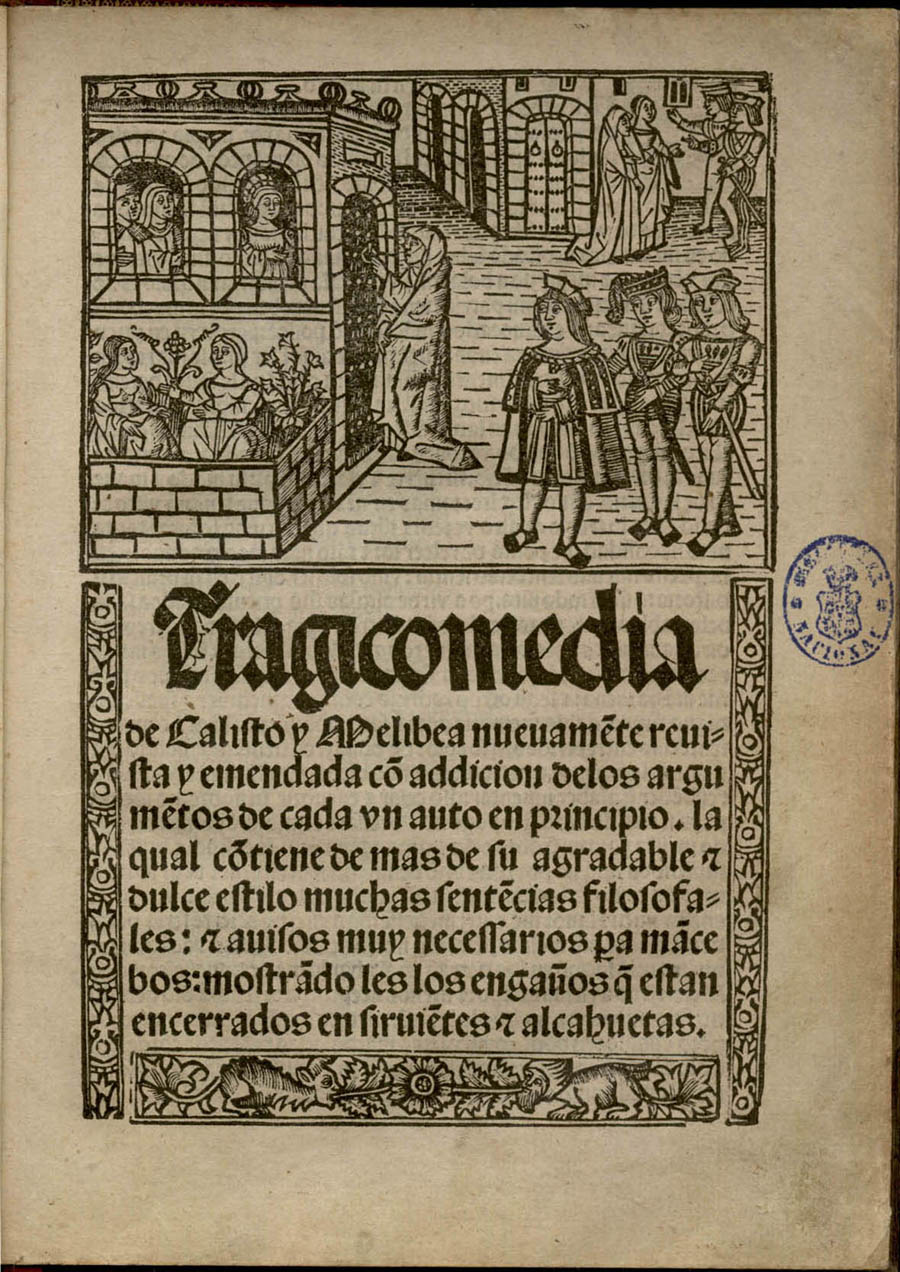
Tragicomedia de Calisto y Melibea (La Celestina). First edition, Fadrique Alemán de Basilea, Burgos, 1499. Hispanic Society of America, 1909.

Fadrique Alemán de Basilea (fl. 1484–1517), also known as Friedrich Biel, Fridericus de Basilea and Federigo Aleman, was an early printer in Spain, who introduced printing to Burgos.

He had previously worked in Basel with Michael Wenssler.
