= Abu Haritha =

Abu Haritha (Arabic: أَبُو حَارِثَةَ, romanized: ʾAbū Ḥāritha) was a Grand Bishop of Najran, as well as the official representative of the Roman Church in Najran (present-day Yemen), located in the Arabian Peninsula. He was alive during the time of Islam's Prophet Muhammad, and was involved in the Event of Mubahala in an exchange of letters and encounter with Muhammad.

== Story ==
According to Islamic sources, Muhammad sent Bishop Abdul Haris Ibn Alqama a letter during the ninth year of Hijra, inviting the Bishop's Christian followers to embrace the teachings of Islam. The letter read: "In the name the Lord of Abraham, Isaac and Jacob … I invite you all to worship God instead of worshiping his creatures, so that you may come out of the guardianship of the creatures of Allah and take place under the guardianship of Allah himself…"

In response to that letter, a delegation of sixty Christian men, including 24 from noble families from Najran, travelled to meet with Muhammad in Medina between 21 and 25 of Dhu'l-Hijja 10 A.H. / 22 to 26 March 632 A.D. [specific dates contested]. The delegation was headed by three notables, Bishop Abu Haritha Bin Alqamah (in charge of religious affairs), Abd al-Masih al-Aqib (in charge of princehood and government affairs) and Al-Aiham As-Saiyid (in charge of educational and political affairs).

The discussions of theology began, with the subject eventually turning to Jesus, the Messiah, and the question of defining what and who Jesus is understood to be. Muhammad preached to them and requested they accept Islam. The Christians, however, were not convinced and responded with their explanations of Christ being divine.

Because of the Christian's refusal to accept Muhammad's demand to acknowledge his prophetic message of Jesus, the call to invoke a curse was initiated by Muhammad.

According to the traditional account, after being unable to resolve the conflict over who Jesus is, the following verses known as the "Verse of Mubahalah" are believed to have been revealed to Muhammad:

"Surely the case of Jesus is like the case of Adam. He created him from dust, then he said to him, "Be,″ and he was. This is the truth from thy Lord, so be thou not of those who doubt. Now whoso disputes with thee concerning him, after what has come to thee of Knowledge, say to him "Come let us call abnā’anā (Arabic: أَبـنـاءنـا, our sons) and abnā’akum (Arabic: أَبـنـاءكـم, your sons) and nisā’anā (Arabic: نِـسـاءنـا, our women) and nisā’kum (Arabic: نِـسـاءكـم, your women) and anfusanā (Arabic: أَنـفـسـنـا, ourselves) and anfusakum (Arabic: أَنـفـسـكـم, yourselves), then let us pray fervently and invoke the curse of Allah on those who lie." (Quran, 3:59-61)

Al-Mubahalah (Arabic: المباهلة) is derived from the Arabic word bahlah (curse). Bahala is a root verb meaning "to curse". Al-bahl (the curse) also means a scarcity of water. The term 'mubahala' can also mean withdrawing mercy from one who lies or engages in falsehood. In the Quran, al-mubahala (invocation of God's curse) was mentioned as a decisive solution to the dispute over Jesus between the Christians of Najran and Muhammad. Allah ordered Muhammad to call on the Christians to invoke God's curse (mubahala – verse 3.61) in order to determine who was telling the truth.

The Quran's mubahala verse is one of the most controversial verses due to the debate with Christianity and more-so the Shia and Sunni division within Islam. Praying for God to curse the liar regarding religious disputes is an ancient Arabic tradition. Mubahala was common among Semitic tribes, and was found in pre-Islamic writings.

The event of Mubahala is an instance of the Quran's critique of a central Christian doctrine: God on earth as Christ (Incarnation). From this historical event, Muslims were to continue challenging and criticizing major points of the Christian faith with Christians defending and defining their doctrines as well as their practices.

Eid al-Mubahalah is an annual Shia Muslim commemoration of Mubahala. While Eid al-Mubahalah is always on nearly the same day (24 Dhu al-Hijjah) of the Islamic calendar, the date on the Gregorian calendar varies yearly because of the differences between the Hijri calendar (AH), which is a lunar calendar and the Gregorian calendar which is a solar calendar.

== See also ==
- Christian community of Najran
- Event of Mubahala
