= Francisco Hernández de Toledo =

Spanish physician (1515–1587)

Francisco Hernández
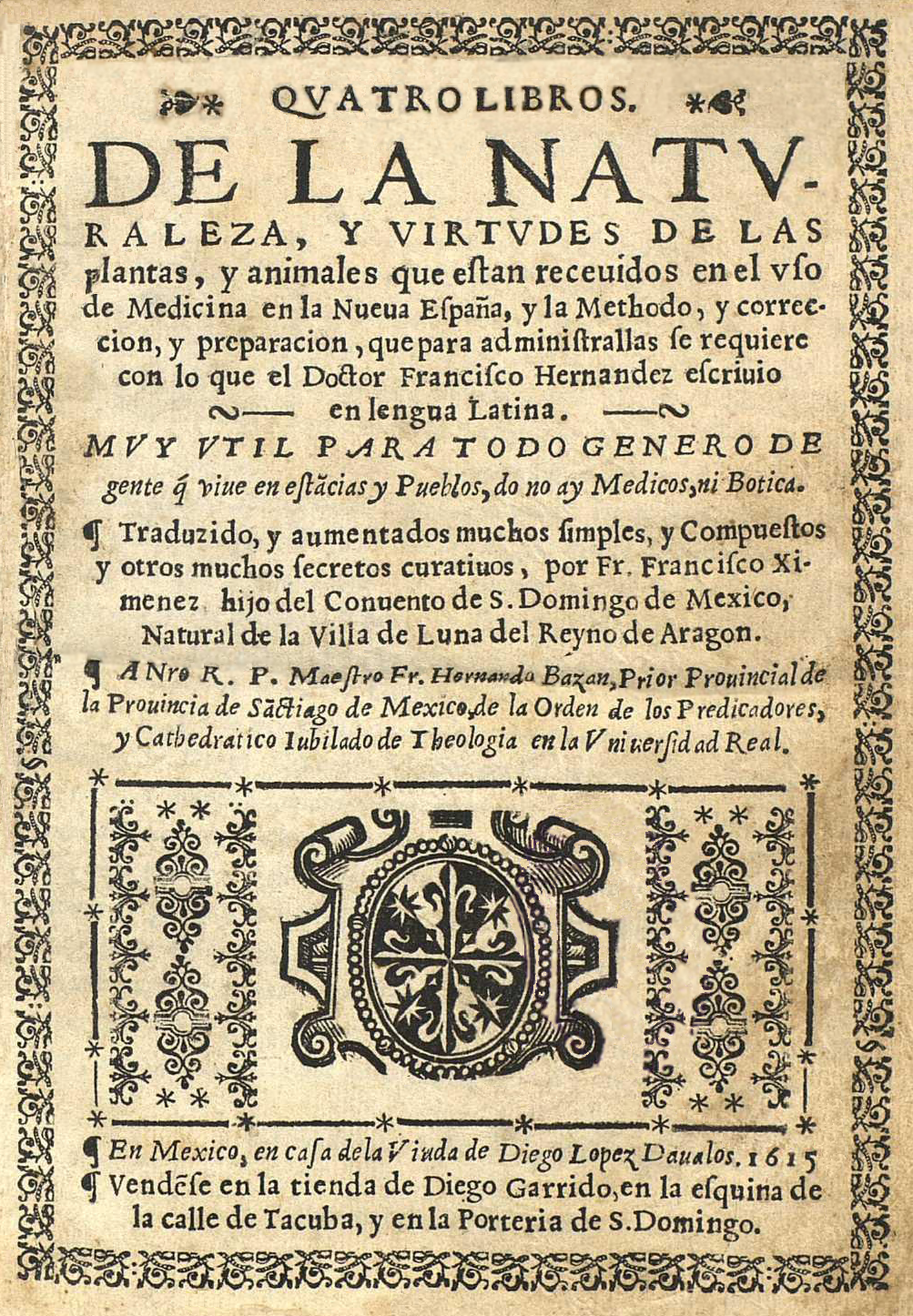
- Cover of the book "Four books of nature and virtues of plants and animals" by Francisco Hernandez written in Latin, and translated into Spanish by Francisco Ximenez in 1615.
- Born: Bruno de Heceta y Dudagoitia c. 1515; La Puebla de Montalbán, Province of Toledo Spain
- Died: 28 January 1587; Madrid, Spain
- Occupations: physician, naturalist

Francisco Hernández de Toledo (c. 1515 – 28 January 1587) was a naturalist and court physician to Philip II of Spain. He was among the first wave of Spanish Renaissance physicians practicing according to the revived principles formulated by Hippocrates, Galen and Avicenna.

Francisco Hernández was born at La Puebla de Montalbán in the Province of Toledo, probably around 1515. Nothing is known of his parents or other family. His original surname was Fernando which he changed to Hernando in 1570 and then changed again to Hernández, the name he used until his death in 1587.

In 1530 he began to study medicine at the University of Alcalá and received a bachelor's degree in 1536. After graduation, Hernández served as physician to the Duke of Maqueda in Toledo and later practiced medicine in Seville where he married Juana Díaz with whom he had two children, Juan Hernández and María of Sotomayor.

From 1556 to 1560 Hernández served as a physician at the Hospital y Monasterio de Guadalupe in Extremadura, where he managed the botanical garden and took part in the anatomical dissections with Francisco Miró. In 1560 he moved to Toledo and for a short time practiced medicine at the Hospital de la Santa Cruz. While in Toledo, he travelled frequently to the royal court in Madrid where he became acquainted with the noted anatomist, Andreas Vesalius. During this time, Hernández also became a prolific writer, penning commentaries on Galen and Hippocrates, and undertaking an ambitious translation of Pliny's Natural History.

In 1567 Hernández became a personal physician to King Philip II.

== Scientific expedition to the New World ==
In 1570, Hernández was ordered to embark on the first scientific mission in the New World, a study of the region's medicinal plants and animals. Accompanied by his son Juan, he traveled for 7 years collecting and classifying specimens. Hernández collected an estimated 3,000 species on this expedition. Along the way, he also interviewed the indigenous people through translators and conducted medical studies in Mexico. He was assisted with his illustrations by three indigenous painters - Baptized Antón, Baltazar Elías, and Pedro Vázquez. During the colonial-period population decline of the Aztecs in 1576, Hernández performed autopsies in the Hospital Real de San José de los Naturales in collaboration with surgeon Alonso López de Hinojosos and physician Juan de la Fuente. Hernández described the gruesome symptoms of the epidemic (referred to as cocoliztli, Nahuatl for "pest") with clinical accuracy.

Hernández's describes over 3,000 Mexican plants, a feat that was significant because classical texts did not amass so much plant biodiversity. His dedication to helping generate an early taxonomy for New World plants allowed for European use. Since the pre-existing botanical terminology was so limited, he used native names (mostly Nahuatl) when classifying the plants. He also used categories of native names, comparison to Old World plants, or a combination of those two instead of the traditional categories of trees, shrubs, and herbs.

Some specific plants of the New World he described include: vanilla, the first written account of it; corn (Zea mays L.), in long and detailed chapters; four varieties of cacao; tobacco; chilis; tomatoes, in four chapters; and cacti, in 14 chapters.

== Publications ==
Hernández was a writer who had to cautiously orchestrate two different themes. He had to show respect toward medieval medicine's own mixture of mythical creatures, magical powers, and miraculous events, and mysterious sympathies while fulfilling his professional mission and recording his personal evaluation of native health practices. In the Natural History of Pliny, Hernández points out his own dissections of human cadavers at Guadalupe and the dissection of a chameleon. Hernández also described plants and animals in detail and analyzed Nahua traditions and practices including their geography, climate, and anthropological considerations in his writings.

Hernández's work was published in 22 books in Latin, and was in the process of being translated to Spanish and probably Nahuatl. To the king, Hernández had transmitted 16 volumes, bounded in blue leather embellished with gold and silver.

Near the end of the 16th century, various editions of Hernández's work were distributed due to the interests of scientists from several European countries. Fabio Colonna, a member of the Accademia de Lincei (Latin for "Academy of the Lynx-eyed"), was the first to publish the work of Hernández. Other notable Italian scientists who made translations of his work include: Peter Martyr, Fernández de Oviedo, Cieza de León, Francisco López de Gomara, Agustín de Zárate, and José Acosta. Ulisse Aldrovandi, a prominent Italian scientist, was interested in Hernández's work and played a pivotal role in developing European botanical studies.

The first text of Hernández's work, Index medicamentorum, was published in Mexico City. It is an index that lists Mexican plants according to therapeutic use and their traditional uses; the index was arranged according to body part, and it was ordered from head to toe. It appeared in Juan Barrios's Spanish translation as an appendix to his medical treaties in 1607.

In 1615, Nardo Antonio Recchi published the first edition of Francisco Hernández's extensive descriptions of his findings in a translated collection entitled Plantas y Animales de la Nueva Espana, y sus virtudes por Francisco Hernández, y de Latin en Romance por Fr. Francisco Ximenez also cited as Cuatro libros de la naturaleza y virtudes de las plantas y animales que están recibidos en uso de medicina en la Nueva España published by Francisco Jiménez. Eventually, the members of the Accademia de Lincei went to edit and familiarize this text.

A heavily redacted compendium in the original Latin was later published as Rerum medicarum Novae Hispaniae thesaurus (Rome, 1628) by collector, Federico Cesi.

Another impression was put out by Johannes Schreck and Fabio Colonna as Nova plantarum, animalium et mineralium mexicanorum historia a Francisco Hernández in indis primum compilata, de inde a Nardo Antonio Reccho in volumen digesta (Rome: Vital Mascardi, 1648).

Some of Hernández' original manuscripts are housed in the library of the Escorial, but many were lost in the fire of July 17, 1671. In the winter of 1565 through 1576, Hernández made a copy of his work, due to numerous commands by King Philip II. This would later be considered the second version of Natural History due to Hernández's meticulous revisions and edits per the king's request. This revised version of his manuscript contained 893 pages of text along with 2,071 pages of paintings of plants so as to relay the New World plants back to Europe. This was the version of text that was destroyed in the fire at the Escorial library. Later, several copies of the artwork were found after the fire from the Codex Pomar, which had titles in Nahuatl and various other American Indian languages. Some of the images that Hernández included were "tobacco (Nicotiana tabacum I.), the mamey or Hitian zaptote (Lucma domingenis Gaertner), the quauhchchioalli or breast tree (Rhus terebinthifolia Schlecht and Ham.), the tozcuitlapilxochitl or cana de cuentas (C. anna indica C.), the armadillo (Dasypus novemcuinctus), the coyote (Canis latrans), and the bird of paradise (Paradisa apoda)."

A new compilation by physician Casimiro Gómez Ortega, based on additional material found in the Colegio Imperial de los Jesuitas de Madrid was entitled Francisci Hernandi, medici atque historici Philippi II, hispan et indiar. Regis, et totius novi orbis archiatri. Opera, cum edita, tum medita, ad autobiographi fidem et jusu regio. (1790).

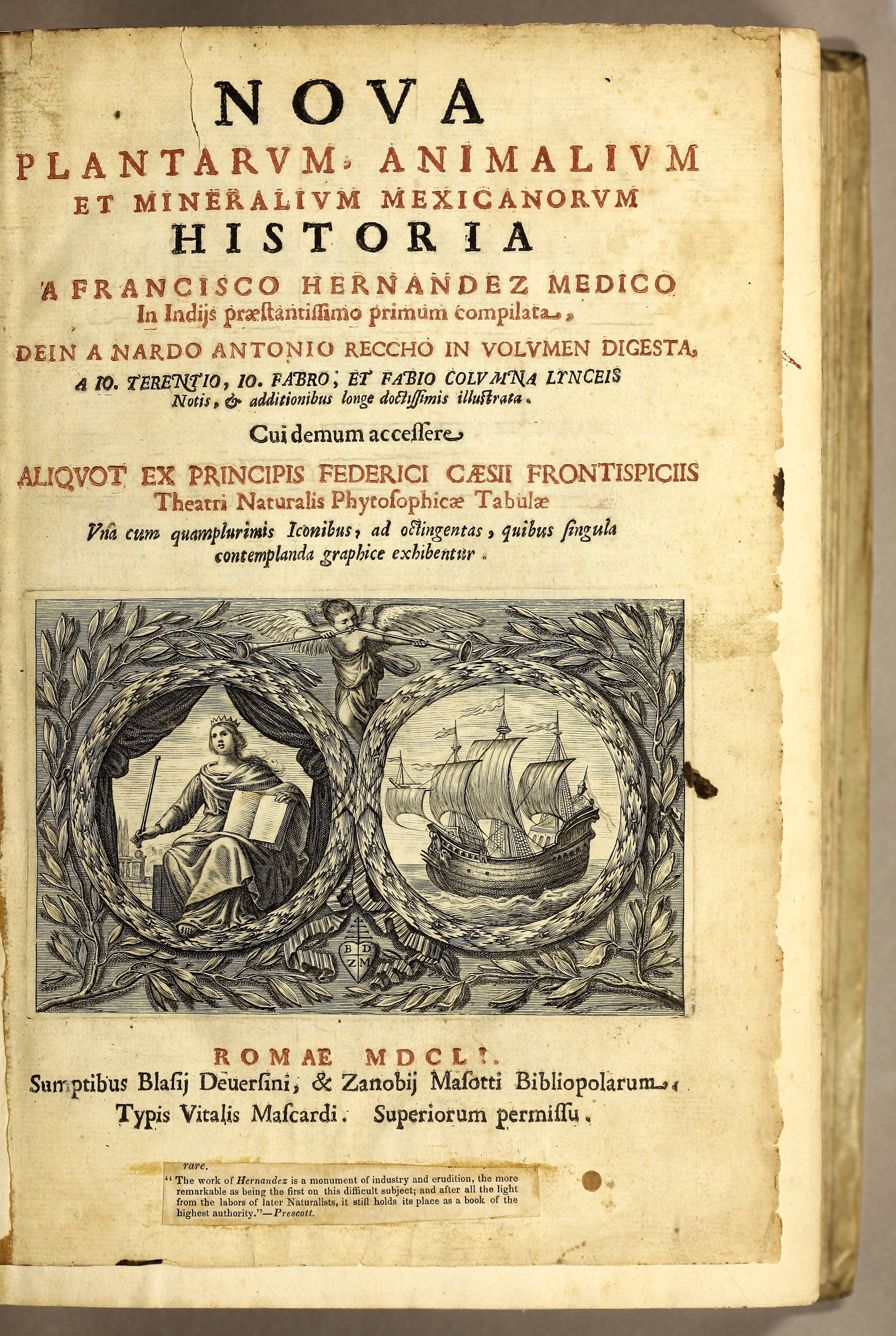
Title page of Recchi's 1651 edition of Nova plantarum, animalium et mineralium Mexicanorum historia

=== Nardo Antonio Recchi's edition ===
Nardo Antonio Recchi edited, reconstructed, and published the second edition of Hernández's work. Recchi had been appointed by King Philip II to teaching botany to physicians in 1580. King Philip II may have chosen to delegate the job to Recchi following Hernández's divergence from his original mission. Benito Montano had claimed, "Hernández had become too friendly with the heathen natives and neglected to instruct and convert them to European ways." However, the primary reason that Recchi was appointed was due to Hernández's rapidly deteriorating health. Recchi's work suffered heavy criticism on his edition, but most prominently for being accused of deforming Hernández's manuscript.

== Reaction to Hernández's work ==
The European Reception of the First Drugs from the New World 1500-1650, by J. Worth Estes, included topics such as guaiacum, balsams, jalap, sassafras, tobacco, and cacao. Hernandez's scholars, José María López Piñero and his colleague José Pardo Tomás, gave an overview and assessed Hernández's contribution to all European botany and materia medica. Their attention was on vanilla, tomato, and corn. Another individual who gave a different illustration of the foods described by Hernandez was María José López Terrada. She traced issues, such as the religious symbolism associated with the passion flower or the established myths that surrounded the sunflower. Today, two postscripts, one by David Hayes-Bautista and the other by Simon Varey and Rafael Chabrán, record the continuation of “a popular tradition of Mexican medicine in Mexico and parts of the U.S. today”.

== Legacy ==
Francisco Hernández is commemorated in the scientific names of two species of lizards: Corytophanes hernandesii and Phrynosoma hernandesi.

Plumier (1703) dedicated him the plant genus Hernandia, which was later accepted by Linnaeus (1753), in the family Hernandiaceae.
