= Battle of Bairén =

Battle of the Reconquista

Coordinates: 39°00′04″N 0°15′18″W

- Part of the Reconquista
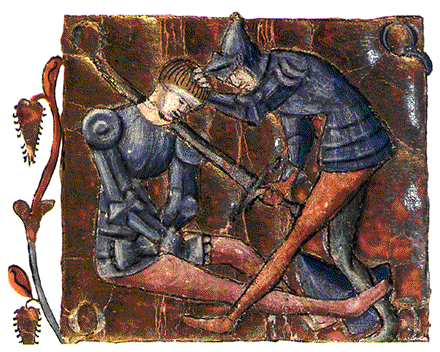
- A depiction of El Cid, who commanded the Aragonese forces in the battle.
Date	1097
Location	Gandia, Spain
Result	Christian victory

Belligerents
Kingdom of Aragon; Lordship of Valencia; Kingdom of Castile	Almoravid dynasty

Commanders and leaders
Peter I of Aragon and Pamplona; Rodrigo Díaz de Vivar	Muhammad ibn Tasufin

The Battle of Bairén was fought between the forces of Rodrigo Díaz de Vivar, also known as "El Cid", in coalition with Peter I of Aragon, against the forces of the Almoravid dynasty, under the command of Muhammad ibn Tasufin. The battle was part of the long Reconquista of Spain, and resulted in a victory for the forces of the Kingdom of Aragon and the Principality of Valencia.

== Background ==
Rodrigo Díaz had conquered the Taifa of Valencia and established the Principality of Valencia on June 17, 1094. El Cid had joined forces with Peter I of Aragon later that year in Burriana to cement an alliance with the end goal of doing battle with the Almoravids. Under this agreement, El Cid departed in December 1096 with the aid of Aragonese troops to bring weapons, ammunition, and general supplies to the castle of Sierra de Benicadell. The castle itself had been retaken by El Cid in October 1091 to control access to Valencia from the south via the interior route. That action had taken place in the course of the operations for the "reconquista" of Levante that the Cid had undertaken before the arrival of the North African Almoravids.

== Battle ==
Muhammad ibn Tashfin, commander of the Islamic forces, marched to intercept the combined Christian forces at Xàtiva. Throughout January 1097, from that position, he threatened and pestered the forces of El Cid and Peter I of Aragon who, nevertheless, managed to reach the castle at Sierra de Benicadell and resupply it.

Whilst El Cid and the king were marching north, they camped at Bairén, a place situated a few kilometers north of Gandía. The Almoravids managed to take the nearby high ground at Mondúver (at 841 meters above sea level), from where they were able to harass the Christian camp. In addition, General Muhammad had managed to bring a fleet of ships, both Almoravid and Andalusian, onto the nearby seashore from which archers and crossbowmen were able to catch the Christian forces in a crossfire.

The situation appeared desperate, but El Cid harangued his troops one morning, ordering them to conduct a frontal charge and assault on the Almoravid forces, breaking their center. By mid-day, the attack was in full swing. The Almoravids, taken aback by the courage and desperate nature of the attack, broke and fled the field in disarray. The chaotic nature of the Muslim retreat led many Almoravid soldiers to drown in the river which crossed their path of retreat or in the sea as they tried to reach the safety of the Almoravid armada.

== Aftermath ==
The Christian army was able to come away from the battle with a great deal of victory spoils after looting the Almoravid camp. After the battle, they were able to continue, in safety, to the city of Valencia.

== Citations ==
- Ayuntamiento de Gea de Albarracín (2016). Cronología de Aragón y otros relacionados. Gea de Albarracín: Ayuntamiento de Gea de Albarracín. Archived from the original on 2016-03-03.
- Montaner Frutos, Alberto; Boix Jovani, Alfonso (2005). Guerra en Šarq Alʼandalus: Las batallas cidianas de Morella (1084) y Cuarte (1094) (in Spanish). Zaragoza: Instituto de Estudios Islámicos y del Oriente Próximo. ISBN 978-84-95736-04-8.

== General References ==
- Fletcher, Richard (1999). El Cid (in Spanish). Nerea. ISBN 8489569290.
- Fletcher, Richard (1991). The Quest for El Cid. Oxford University Press. ISBN 0195069552.
- Martinez Diez, Gonzalo (1999). El Cid (in Spanish). Barcelona: Planeta. ISBN 84-08-03161-9.
- Peña Pérez, F. Javier (2009). Mio Cid el del Cantar. Un héroe medieval a escala humana (in Spanish). Madrid: Sílex. ISBN 978-84-7737-217-2.
