= Sharq al-Andalus =

Historical region of Muslim medieval Spain

The Sharq al-Andalus (Arabic: شرق الاندلس) was the eastern lands of al-Andalus, the Muslim-ruled territories of the Iberian Peninsula during the Middle Ages. It corresponds with the modern-day Region of Murcia, Valencian Community, the southern parts of Aragon and Catalonia and including the Balearic Islands. The Muslim cartographer al-Idrisi outlined the division between Gharb al-Andalus and Sharq al-Andalus on his maps. The territories became part of Al-Andalus through the Muslim conquest of the Iberian Peninsula of the 8th century but was reconquered by the Christian Crown of Aragon, as part of the Reconquista, in the 12th and 13th centuries.

== History ==
During the 8th, 9th and 10th centuries, Sharq al-Andalus was governed by valis dependent on the emir or caliph of Córdoba. At the beginning of the 11th century, when the caliphate broke up into small independent kingdoms (taifas), the taifas of Murcia, Denia, Valencia, Mallorca, Alpuente and Tortosa were created in Sharq al-Andalus.

After the incorporation into al-Andalus, the majority of the Christian population (Mozarabs) converted to Islam (muladis) and adopted the language and ways of life of Islamic society. A large number of Arabs and, above all, Berbers from North Africa also settled in Sharq al-Andalus.

Sharq al-Andalus was integrated into the Islamic world for almost five centuries, until it was largely conquered in the first half of the 13th century by James I of Aragon.
