= Siege of Valencia (1101–1102) =

1101–1102 siege of Valencia in the Reconquista

- Part of Reconquista
Date	August 1101 – 5 May 1102
Location	Valencia, Lordship of Valencia 39°28′12″N 00°22′35″W
Result	Almoravid victory
Territorial changes	Reconquest of Valencia by Almoravids

Belligerents
Lordship of Valencia; Kingdom of Castile	Almoravid dynasty

Commanders and leaders
Jimena Díaz; Alfonso VI of León and Castile	Mazdali ibn Tilankan

Strength
Unknown	Unknown

Casualties and losses
Unknown	Unknown

The siege of Valencia was fought between the Almoravids and the Lordship of Valencia. Valencia was defended by El Cid's widow, Jimena Díaz. After months of siege, the Almoravids occupied the city.

== History ==
In 1099, the Castilian warrior, El Cid, died in Valencia. His widow, Jimena Díaz, took control of Valencia. The Almoravid leader, Yusuf ibn Tashfin, determined to recapture the city of Valencia. In late August 1101, Yusuf dispatched a Berber general, Al-Mazdali, an experienced general, to besiege Valencia with a large army. The Almoravids began the siege. As the siege continued. Jimena dispatched Bishop Jironemo to the Castilian-Leonese king, Alfonso VI.

Alfonso agreed to help, and in March 1102, the king was marching towards Valencia with a strong army. The Almoravids did not wait for their arrival and retreated towards Cullera. The Castilians saw this as weakness from the Moors and decided to follow them. A battle ensued, which ended inconclusively with Alfonso retreating from the field. Alfonso then decided to evacuate Valencia, which was deemed hard to protect as it had no capable commander like El Cid to protect.

In late April or early May, the Castilian made preparations to evacuate Valencia. They carried cattle, weaponry, housegoods, spoils of war, and most importantly, El Cid's body. The Castilians burned down the city. Almoravids watched the smoke arise from the city and did not attempt to stop the retreating Castilians. On May 5, the Almoravids entered Valencia, ending the Lordship of Valencia.

== Sources ==
- Fletcher, Richard A. (1991). The Quest for El Cid. Oxford University Press. ISBN 978-0-19-506955-6.
- Sanz, Vicente Coscollá (2003). La Valencia musulmana. Carena Editors, S.l. ISBN 978-84-87398-75-9.
- Morales y Durán, Tomás (2023). Teresa of Jesus: The Putrid Odor of Holiness. Libros de Verdad. ISBN 979-8-3922-8149-7.
