= Siege of Valencia (1092–1094) =

Conquest of the Muslim kingdom of Valencia by El Cid

Siege of Valencia (1092-1094)
- Part of Reconquista
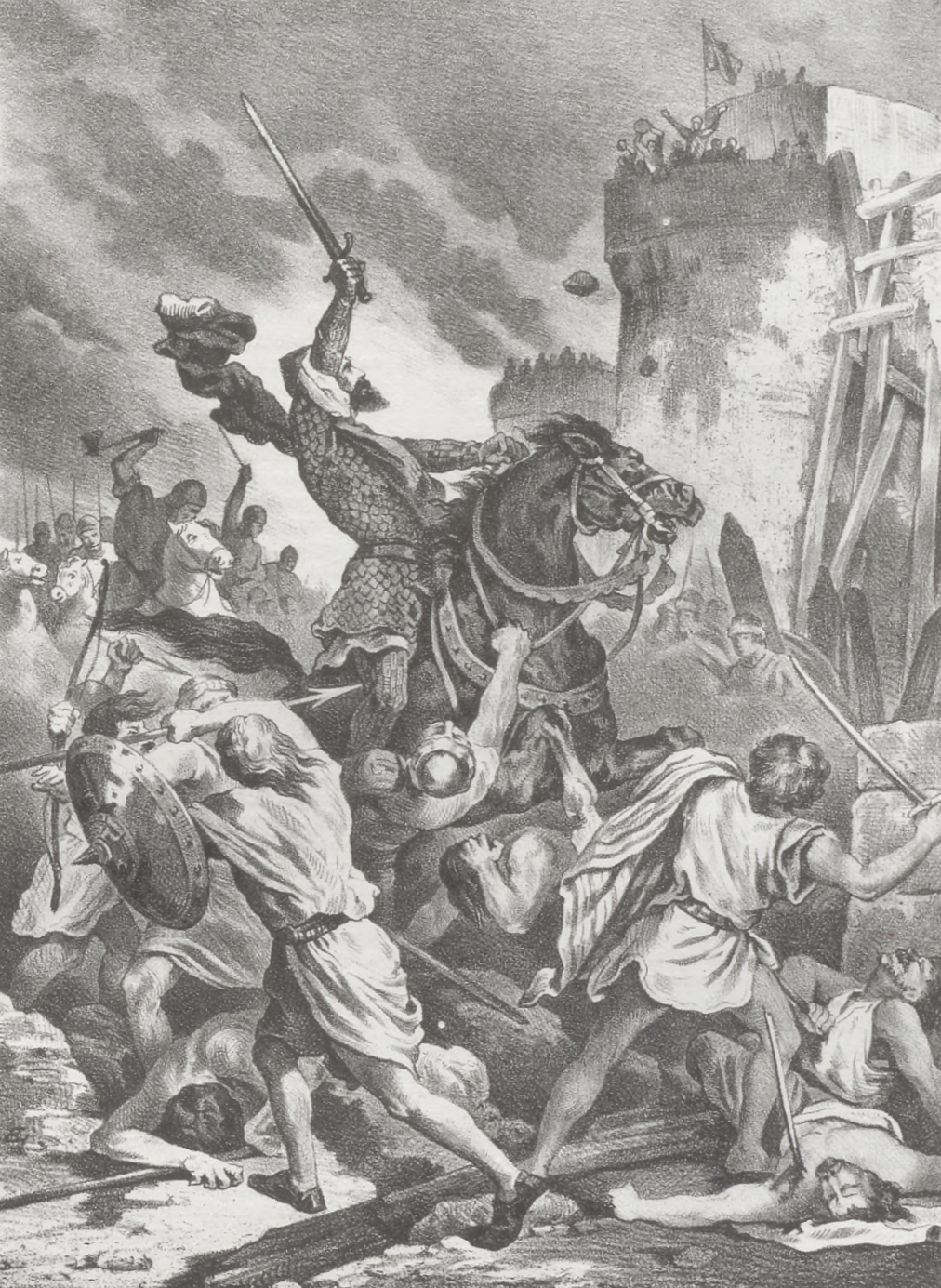
- Siege of Valencia by El Cid (Illustration by J. Serra y Porsón, 1872)
Date	1092–1094
Location	Valencia, Taifa of Valencia 39°28′12″N 00°22′35″W
Result	Christian victory
Territorial changes	Establishment of the Lordship of Valencia

Belligerents
Rodrigo Díaz de Vivar	Taifa of Valencia; Supported by: Almoravid dynasty

Commanders and leaders
Rodrigo Díaz de Vivar	Ibn Jahhaf

Strength
Unknown	Unknown

Casualties and losses
Unknown	Unknown

The Siege of Valencia (1092–1094) was fought between Rodrigo Díaz de Vivar, later revered as “El Cid” and Ibn Jahhaf, the Muslim ruler of the Taifa of Valencia. Rodrigo’s victory established the Christian Lordship of Valencia.

== Background ==
Rodrigo Diaz de Vivar, the opportunistic military warlord associated with the Reconquista in 11th Century Spain had served the Christian King Alfonso VI of León and Castile as early as 1079 when he was sent to collect tribute from the Muslim court of Seville. In 1087, Rodrigo was even appointed to replace Álvar Fáñez as the military leader responsible for protecting al-Qadir in Valencia.

In 1089, however, after the incident at Aledo, Rodrigo broke with Alfonso VI. Exiled in a manner, Rodrigo took his band of warriors and conquested territory in the coastal areas of the Spanish Levante. In that territory, Rodrigo established tributaries supplanting Alfonso VI and Count Berenguer of Barcelona. Rodrigo went so far as to usurp Alfonso VI’s position as the protector of al-Qadir, diverting the tributes to himself. And to emphasize the broken relationship, Rodrigo even attacked Alfonso VI’s kingdom, laying waste to Alberite and Logroño.

Meanwhile in Valencia, al-Qadir’s six year rule was coming to an abrupt end in 1092. Al-Qadir’s administration of the puppet state had been poor and extremely unpopular. As a result, the citizenry led by Ibn Jahhaf, a respected city judge, called upon the advancing Almoravid military to enter the city and depose al-Qadir. Al-Qadir became aware of the revolt and tried to escape, however, he was captured. On 28 October 1092 al-Qadir was executed and Ibn Jahhaf was proclaimed governor of Valencia.

== Siege of Valencia ==
When the news of the revolt in Valencia reached Rodrigo in Zaragoza, he decided to intercede largely in an attempt to protect the tribute that he had been collecting.

Rodrigo immediately began the preparations for a siege by attacking and capturing the city of Cebolla nine miles from the city of Valencia. At Cebolla, Rodrigo established his base of operations. In addition, Rodrigo entered into an agreement with ‘Abd al-Malik ibn Razin, the ruler of the Taifa of Albarracín, whereby al-Malik would allow Rodrigo to buy and sell materials and supplies.

In July of 1093, Rodrigo began the formal siege of Valencia. Rodrigo’s army was reportedly not that large and as a result his strategy was to cut off the supplies to the city, starve out the populace, and hopefully wear down their morale to the point that they would surrender. In that regard, Rodrigo’s forces attempted to avoid direct attacks and confrontation at the city walls focusing instead upon attacking the cities and towns surrounding Valencia seizing the livestock and crops. In such attacks, Rodrigo spared those that chose to support him and vowed to continue to pay tribute but raze and ravage those that supported the Muslin revolt.

Inside the city of Valencia, Ibn Jahhaf and the Almoravid contingent sent urgent requests for assistance to Yusuf ibn Tashfin, the Amir of the Almoravids and to Al-Musta'in II the Emir of the Taifa of Zaragoza. Rodrigo continued to press the siege. Al-Musta'in II refused to send assistance. Food shortages developed in Valencia and the citizenry resorted to eating dogs, rats, and even cadavers. Yusuf finally made the decision to dispatch a relief force in the fall of 1093, however, the effort seems to have been delayed as the Almoravid's main initiative at the time was in the western portion of al-Andalus at the Taifa of Badajoz.

By the time that an Almoravid relief force neared Valencia, it was too late. The relief force never engaged Rodrigo’s forces as Ibn Jahhaf began negotiations in May and surrendered the city of Valencia. On 17 June 1094, the city gates were opened and Rodrigo entered with his army.

== Aftermath ==
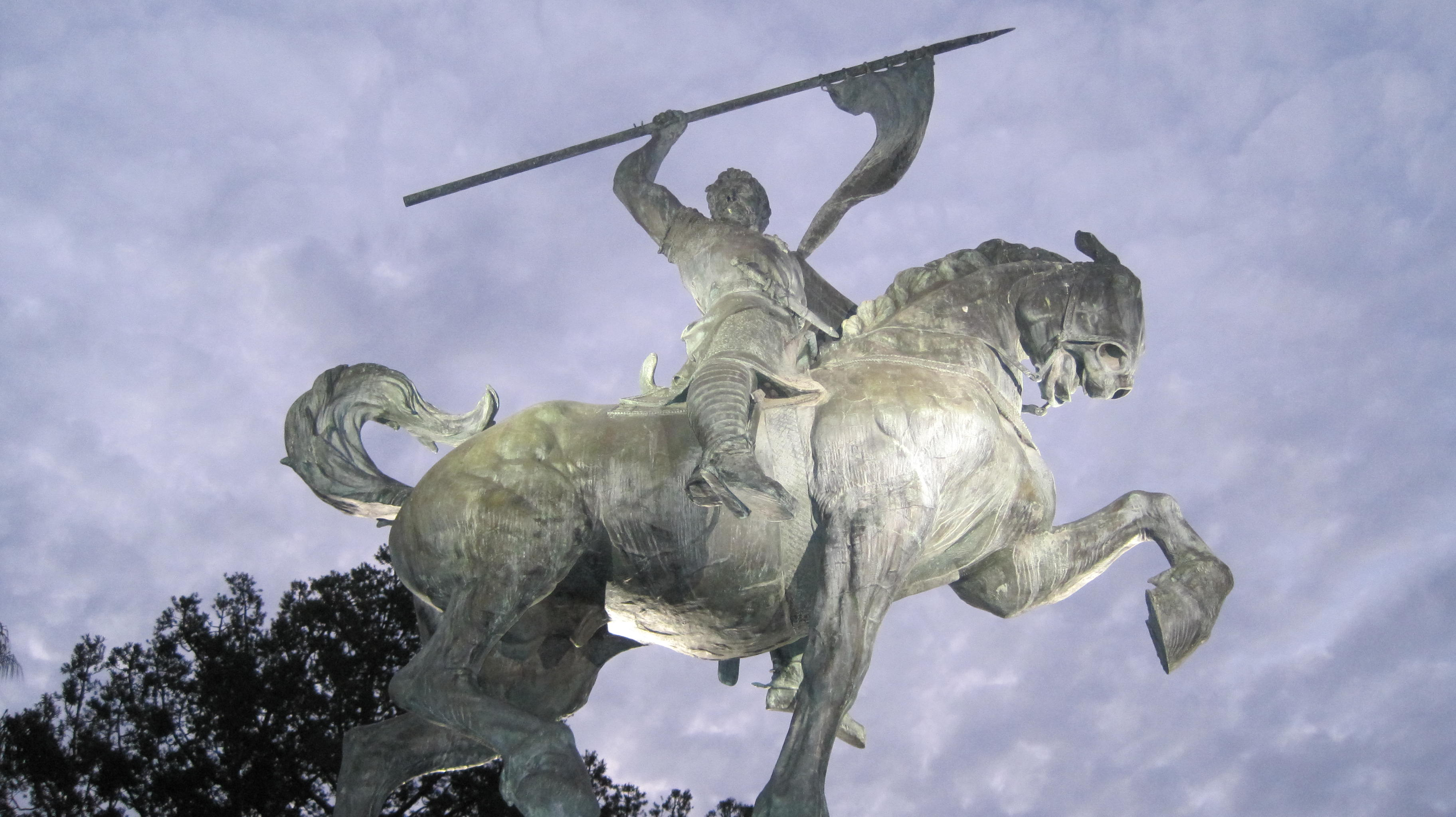
Statue of El Cid at San Diego, California

Upon entering Valencia, Rodrigo did not instantly depose Ibn Jahhaf. To facilitate the takeover and maintain civil authority within the predominantly Muslim population, Rodrigo entered into a pact with Ibn Jahhaf. Over the next 12 months with the agreement in place, Rodrigo dealt with numerous issues. First and foremost, he prepared for attack by the Almoravids as Yusuf had immediately ordered that Valencia be recaptured giving the command of a new expedition to his nephew Muhammad ibn Tashfin.

The Almoravid army assigned to the task crossed the Strait of Gibraltar from Ceuta and landed on the Iberian Peninsula near Algeciras in mid-August. From there, Tashfin marched his troops north to a level plain named Cuarte approximately five kilometers west of Valencia, arriving in mid-September.

After the observation of Ramadan ended on October 14, Tashfin initiated a siege and began daily attacks on the city walls and outlying neighborhoods. Although outnumbered, Rodrigo remained confident and through the use of rumors related to relief armies and threats of retribution, managed to discourage the Almoravids and create offensive opportunities for himself.

On 21 October 1094, the siege came to an end when Rodrigo secretly positioned the bulk of his forces outside the city walls during the night and attacked Tashfin’s unprotected camp at dawn. By midday, Rodrigo had won a decisive victory over Tashfin’s forces in what is known today as the Battle of Cuarte.

With the external threat neutralized, Rodrigo consolidated his power and set about to establish a military administration. During late winter of 1094, Rodrigo continued his investigation into the state treasuries that Ibn Jahhaf had confiscated in 1092 when he first entered the city and deposed al-Qadir. In late spring of 1095, when Rodrigo discovered that Ibn Jahhaf had hidden the treasures and did not intend to return the valuable to the state, he withdrew from the pact and ordered that Ibn Jahhaf be arrested and executed.

Following the elimination of Ibn Jahhaf and his political network, El Cid claimed absolute, direct sovereign authority over Valencia. From that point forward, Rodrigo ruled Valencia unconditionally as chief magistrate and supreme ruler over both Christian and Muslim subjects, establishing the formal independent principality that historical timelines record starting in 1095.

In the years that followed, the Almoravids would continue their attempts to capture the newly founded Lordship of Valencia, only succeeding in 1102 after the death of Rodrigo’s widow.
