= Lordship of Valencia =

Medieval kingdom in Valencia

Principality of Valencia Lordship of Valencia Laurentius Valentinus (Latin) Señorío de Valencia (Spanish) سيادة بلنسية (Arabic)
- 1094–1102
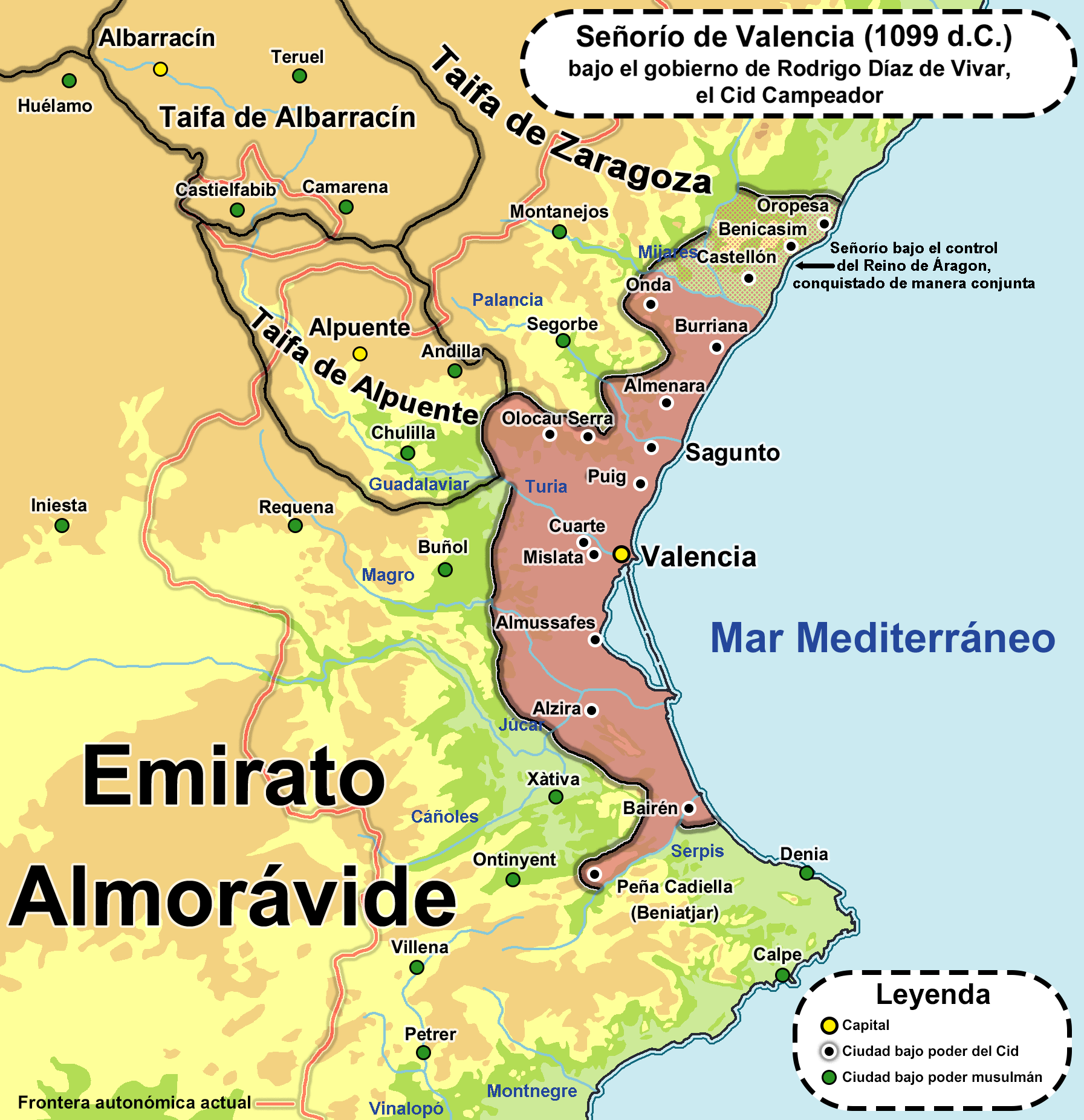
- Lordship of Valencia (1094-1102) founded by El Cid in 1099 (the year of his death).
- Capital: Valencia
- Official languages: Latin, Medieval Spanish, Arabic and Mozarabic
- Religion: Catholicism and Islam
- Demonym: Valencian
- Government: Monarchy
  - 1094–1099: Rodrigo Díaz de Vivar
  - 1099–1102: Jimena Díaz

Establishment
- Historical era: Middle Ages
  - Conquest of Valencia by El Cid: 1094
  - Jimena Díaz and her court leave Valencia: 1102
  - Established: 1094
  - Disestablished: 1102
Preceded by	Succeeded by
Taifa of Valencia	Almoravid Emirate
- Today part of: Spain

The Lordship or Principality of Valencia was the state established by El Cid in the city of Valencia and its surroundings and which existed between the years 1094 and 1102.

== History ==
=== Conquest ===
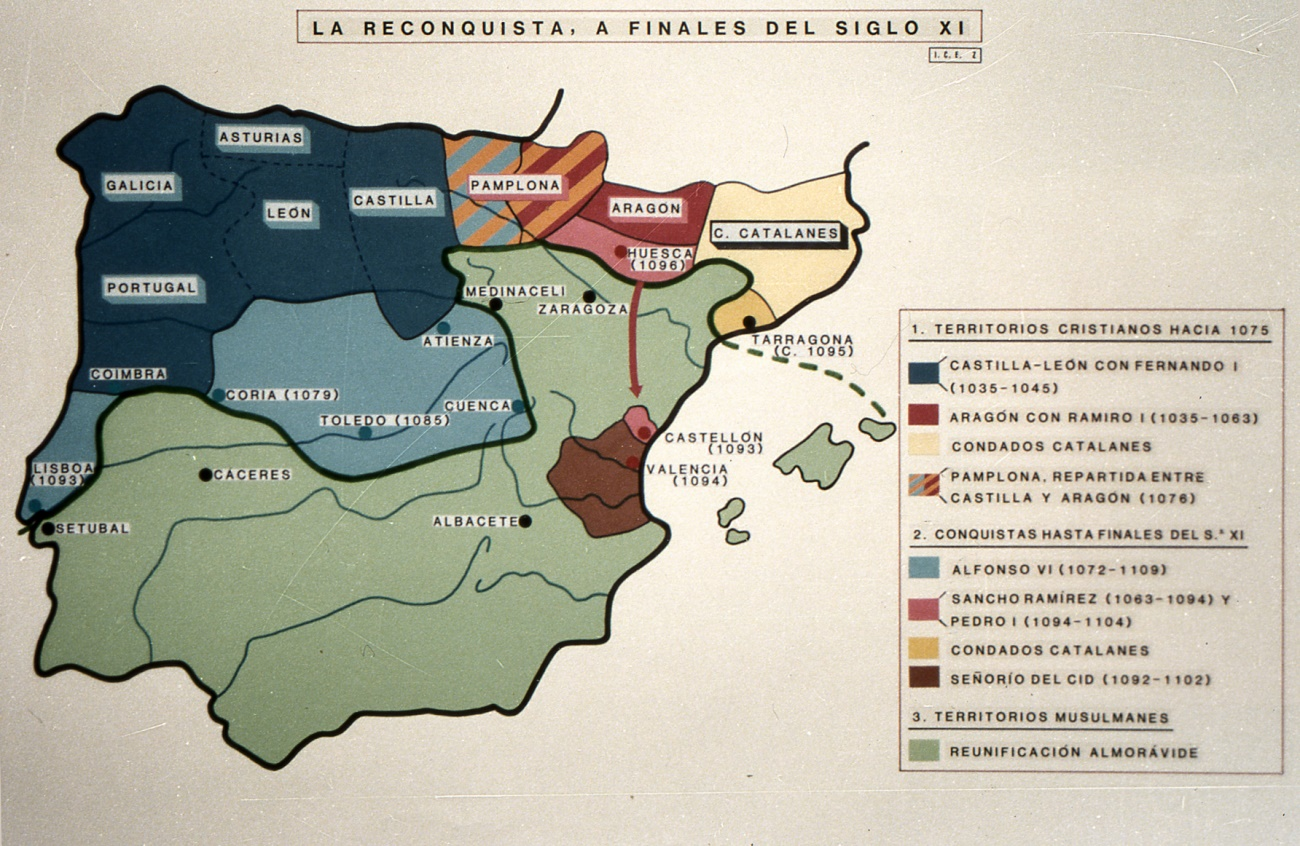
Map of the Iberian Peninsula at the end of the 11th century, with the Lordship of El Cid

Towards the beginning of November 1092, the Campeador besieged the fortress, currently in the municipality of El Puig, fourteen kilometres from Valencia, surrendering it in mid-1093. Using it as a centre of operations, that summer he began to besiege the city. In September 1093, he changed camp and settled in La Roqueta. Valencia, in a situation of extreme danger, requested an Almoravid relief army, which was sent under the command of al-Latmuni and advanced from the south of the capital of the Turia to Almussafes, twenty-three kilometres from Valencia, and then retreated again due to a storm. The tight siege would last for almost a whole year, after which Valencia was forced to surrender on 17 June 1094. El Cid took possession of the city, calling himself "Prince Rodrigo el Campeador" and settling in the city.

=== Consolidation and expansion ===
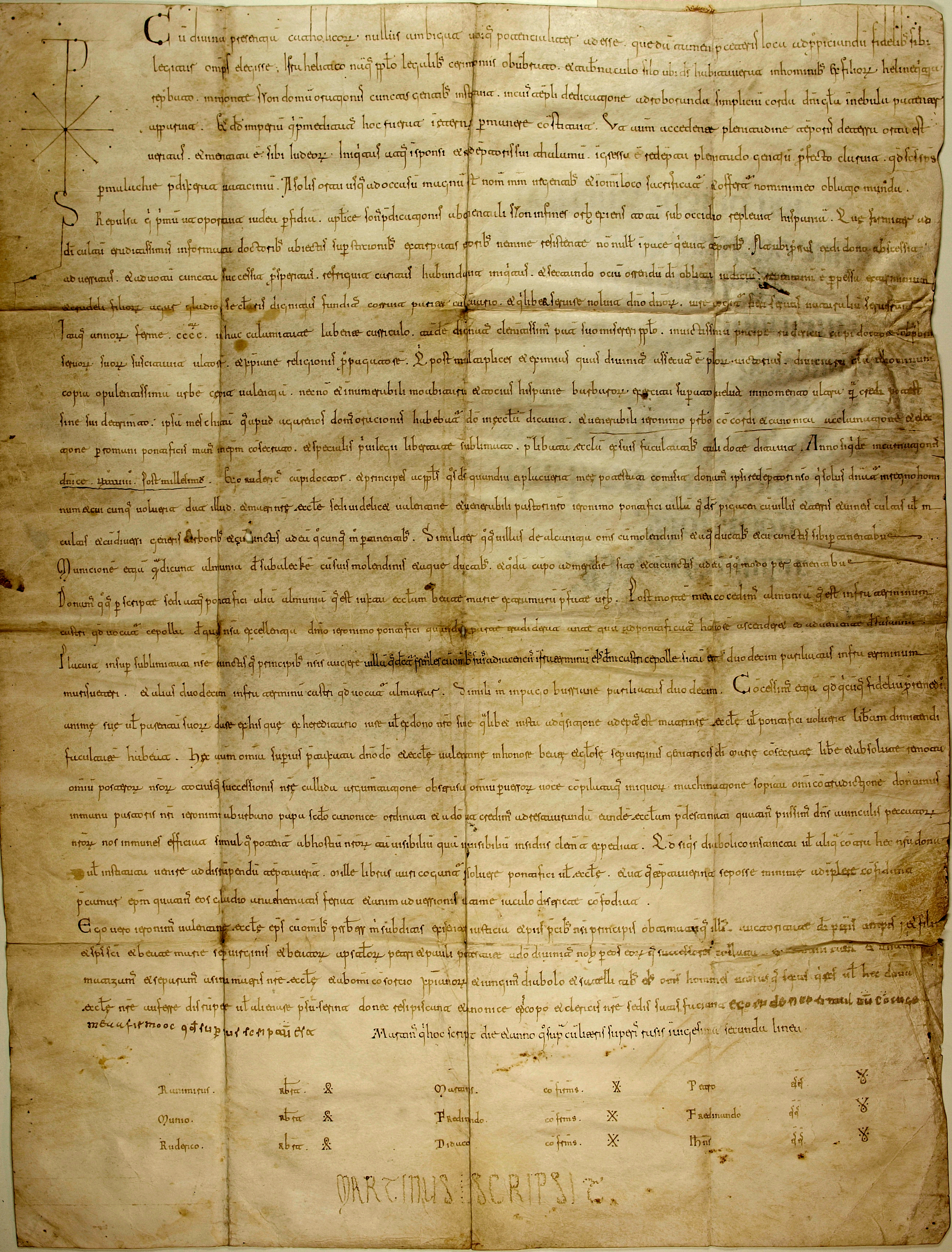
The endowment diploma of the Valencia Cathedral, signed by Rodrigo Díaz

The Almoravid pressure did not relent and in mid-September of that same year an army under the command of Muhammad ibn Tashfin, nephew of Emir Yusuf, reached Quart de Poblet, five kilometers from the capital, and besieged it, but was defeated after the Battle of Cuarte, which took place on October 21, 1094 between the towns of Mislata and Quart de Poblet, near the city.

In order to secure the northern routes of the new lordship, Rodrigo managed to ally himself with the new king of Aragon, Peter I, who had been enthroned shortly before the fall of Valencia during the siege of Huesca, and took the Castle of Serra and the Castle of Real, at that time called Alucad in 1095.

In 1097, a new Almoravid incursion led again by Muhammad ibn Tashfin attempted to recover Valencia, but he was defeated again by El Cid with the collaboration of the army of Peter I of Aragon at the battle of Bairén, near Gandia. At the end of that same year he took Almenara, thus closing the routes to the north of Valencia and in 1098 he finally conquered the imposing fortified city of Sagunto, thus consolidating his dominion over what had previously been the Taifa of Valencia. Also in 1098 he consecrated the new Cathedral of Santa María, reforming the one that had been main mosque. He had placed a Frenchman, Jerome of Perigord, at the head of the new episcopal see to the detriment of the old Mozarabic metropolitan or sayyid almaṭran. In the diploma of endowment of the cathedral of the end of 1098 Rodrigo presents himself as «princeps Rodericus Campidoctor», considering himself an autonomous sovereign despite not having royal ancestry, and the Battle of Cuarte is referred to as "a victory achieved quickly and without casualties over an enormous number of Muslims".

Already established in Valencia, he also allied himself with Ramon Berenguer III with the aim of stopping the Almoravid advance. Military alliances were reinforced with marriages. The year of his death (1099) he had married his daughters to high dignitaries: Cristina with the infant Ramiro Sánchez of Pamplona and María with the Count of Barcelona Ramon Berenguer III.

=== Dissolution ===
After his death on 10 June 1099, his wife Jimena became Lady of Valencia. The Almoravids started a siege on the city and she managed to defend it with the help of Ramon Berenguer III of Barcelona until May 1102, when Alfonso VI of León and Castile, considering the difficulties of defending Valencia, on 4 May 1102 ordered the evacuation of the city of Christians, subsequently setting it on fire. The next day, on 5 May 1102, Valencia fell into the hands of the Almoravids.

== Bibliography ==
- Ferreiro, Miguel Ángel (18 October 2022). La segunda columna: Lo que dejamos en África. ISBN 978-84-414-4198-9.
- Coscollá, Vicente (2003). La Valencia musulmana (in Spanish). Valencia: Carena Editors. ISBN 84-87398-75-8.
- Montaner Frutos, Alberto (2005). "La fecha exacta de la rendición de Valencia". Guerra en Šarq Alʼandalus: Las batallas cidianas de Morella (1084) y Cuarte (1094). Zaragoza: Instituto de Estudios Islámicos y del Oriente Próximo. pp. 97–340. ISBN 978-84-95736-04-8.
- Estrada, Francisco López (1982). Panorama crítico sobre el «Poema del Cid». Literatura y sociedad. Madrid. ISBN 978-84-7039-400-3.
- Michael, Ian (1976). Poema de mio Cid (in Spanish). Castalia. ISBN 978-84-7039-171-2.
- Sanchis, Antonio (2005). Historia del Grau (in Spanish). Carena Editors, S.l. ISBN 978-84-96419-11-7.
- Berend, Nora (7 November 2024). El Cid: The Life and Afterlife of a Medieval Mercenary. Hodder & Stoughton. ISBN 978-1-3997-0964-4.
- Sanz, Vicente Coscollà (2004). La Valencia musulmana. Valencia. pp. 40–43. ISBN 978-84-87398-75-9.
- Messier, Ronald A. (19 August 2010). The Almoravids and the Meanings of Jihad. Bloomsbury Publishing USA. ISBN 978-0-313-38590-2.
- Catlos, Brian A. (2014). Infidel Kings and Unholy Warriors. Macmillan + ORM. ISBN 978-0-374-71205-1.
- González, David Porrinas (25 May 2020). El Cid. Historia y mito de un señor de la guerra (in Spanish). Desperta Ferro Ediciones. ISBN 978-84-121053-7-7.
- Arenas, Francisco Rodríguez (2020). Sol de oriente (in Spanish). ISBN 9788418448133.
- Pidal, Ramón Menéndez (1923). Poema de mio Cid (in Spanish). University of Michigan.
- Manjunath, R (3 July 2021). Timelines of Nearly Everything.
- Ormsby, John (1879). The Poem of the Cid.
- Hooper, Nicolas; Bennett, Matthew (8 November 2001). Atlas ilustrado de la guerra (in Spanish). Ediciones Akal. ISBN 9788446009641.
- Alcaide, Luis Jiménez (14 November 2022). Historia de los reinos cristianos: Los monarcas de la reconquista, desde Don Pelayo hasta Juana la Loca. Editorial Almuzara. ISBN 978-84-1131-511-1.
- Pidal, Ramón Menéndez (6 January 1947). Obras completas (in Spanish). Vol. 7. Espasa-Calpe.
- Garfield, Evelyn Picon; Schulman, Iván A. (1991). Las literaturas hispánicas (in Spanish).
- Ibrahim, Raymond (26 July 2022). Defenders of the West: The Christian Heroes Who Stood Against Islam. Bombardier Books. ISBN 9781642938210.
