= List of reptiles of Costa Rica =

This is a list of reptiles in Costa Rica.

== Lizards ==
=== Family Corytophanidae ===
- Genus Basiliscus (brown basilisk, common basilisk, plumed basilisk)
- Genus Corytophanes (helmeted iguana)
- Genus Laemanctus (casquehead iguana)

=== Family Dactyloidae ===
- Genus Anolis (Anolis insignis, Anolis microtus)

=== Family Gekkonidae ===
- Genus Gonatodes (yellow-headed gecko)
- Genus Hemidactylus (common house gecko)
- Genus Lepidoblepharis (Costa Rica scaly-eyed gecko)
- Genus Sphaerodactylus (yellow-tailed dwarf gecko, spotted dwarf gecko)
- Genus Lepidodactylus (mourning gecko)

=== Family Iguanidae ===
- Genus Ctenosaura (black spiny-tailed iguana)
- Genus Iguana (green iguana)

=== Family Phyllodactylidae ===
- Genus Thecadactylus (turnip-tailed gecko)

=== Family Polychrotidae ===
- Genus Norops (21 species, including blue-eyed anole, Carpenter's anole, green tree anole, ground anole, lemur anole, lichen anole, many-scaled anole, pug-nosed anole, slender anole, stream anole, water anole)
- Genus Polychrus (neotropical chameleon)

=== Family Scincidae ===
- Mabuya unamarginata

=== Family Teiidae ===
- Anadia ocellata
- Holcosus quadrilineatus
- Holcosus festivus
- Ptychoglossus plicatus

=== Family Xantusiidae ===
- Lepidophyma reticulatum

== Snakes ==
=== Family Anomalepididae ===
- Anomalepis mexicana
- Helminthophis frontalis
- Liotyphlops albirostris

=== Family Boidae ===
- Boa imperator
- Epicrates cenchria

=== Family Colubridae ===
- Amastridium veliferum (rufous-headed snake)
- Chironius exoletus
- Clelia clelia
- Drymobius melanotropis (black forest racer)
- Drymobius margaritiferus (speckled racer)
- Enuliophis sclateri (sock-headed snake)
- Erythrolamprus mimus (mimic false coral snake)
- Imantodes cenchoa
- Lampropeltis triangulum
- Leptophis ahaetulla (parrot snake)
- Erythrolamprus epinephalus (fire-bellied snake)
- Leptodeira septentrionalis
- Mastigodryas melanolomus
- Ninia maculata
- Scaphiodontophis venustissimus
- Senticolis triaspis (green rat snake)
- Spilotes pullatus (tiger rat snake)
- Stenorrhina degenhardtii
- Stenorrhina freminvillei (blood snake)
- Genus Tantilla (centipede snakes)
- Thamnophis proximus
- Xenodon rhabdocephalus

=== Family Elapidae ===
- Micrurus alleni
- Micrurus mipartitus

=== Family Leptotyphlopidae ===
- Leptotyphlops goudotii

=== Family Loxocemidae ===
- Loxocemus bicolor

=== Family Tropidophiidae ===
- Ungaliophis panamensis

=== Family Typhlopidae ===
- Typhlops costaricensis

=== Family Viperidae ===
- Atropoides nummifer
- Atropoides picadoi
- Bothriechis lateralis
- Bothriechis nigroadspersus
- Bothrops asper
- Porthidium nasutum
- Lachesis stenophrys Cope 1875 Nicaragua, Costa Rica, Panama
- Lachesis melanocephala Solòrzano & Cerdas 1986 southeastern Costa Rica and adjoining areas of western Panama

== Turtles ==
- Kinosternon leucostomum
- Rhinoclemmys annulata
- Rhinoclemmys funerea
- Rhinoclemmys pulcherrima
- Trachemys emolli
- Trachemys venusta

== Crocodilians ==
=== Family Crocodylidae ===
- American crocodile

=== Family Alligatoridae ===
- Spectacled caiman

== See also ==
- List of amphibians of Costa Rica
- List of birds of Costa Rica
- List of mammals of Costa Rica
- List of non-marine molluscs of Costa Rica
