= Babibasiliscus =

Babibasiliscus Temporal range: Early Eocene, 48 Ma
- Holotype skull

Scientific classification
- Kingdom: Animalia
- Phylum: Chordata
- Class: Reptilia
- Order: Squamata
- Suborder: Iguania
- Family: Corytophanidae
- Genus: †Babibasiliscus; Conrad, 2015

Type species
- †Babibasiliscus alxi Conrad, 2015

Extinct genus of lizard

Babibasiliscus is an extinct genus of casquehead lizard (family Corytophanidae) that lived in what is now Wyoming during the early Eocene, approximately 48 million years ago. The genus is known from a single species, Babibasiliscus alxi, which was named by paleontologist Jack Conrad in 2015 on the basis of a fossilized skull from the Bridger Formation in the Green River Basin. The name Babibasiliscus comes from the Shoshoni word babi, meaning "older male cousin", and Basiliscus, a modern-day genus of casquehead lizards. The specimen is undeformed and nearly complete except for the tip of the snout and the top of the skull, making it unclear whether the distinctive bony crest of living corytophanids was present in prehistoric relatives like Babibasiliscus. The skull is about 42 millimetres (2 in) in length and the entire body is estimated to have been about 0.6 metres (2 ft) long. Bones on the right side of the lower jaw of the specimen are thickened and fused together, suggesting that the jaw had broken and healed when the animal was alive.

Babibasiliscus occurs farther north than any living genus of corytophanid. During the Eocene, temperatures in what is now Wyoming were about 9 °C (16 °F) warmer than they are today, and the region was likely covered by a tropical forest based on other Eocene fossil assemblages known from western North America.

Comparison of multiple corytophanid skulls (Babibasiliscus in F)

Phylogenetic analysis indicates that Babibasiliscus is deeply nested within Corytophanidae as the sister taxon of the living genus Laemanctus. Below is a cladogram from Conrad's description of Babibasiliscus showing its relationships to other corytophanids:

- Iguania
  - Chamaeleontiformes
  - Pleurodonta
    - †Aciprion formosum
    - †Suzanniwana patriciana
    - - - - Leiosauridae
          - Opluridae
        - - †Afairiguana avius
          - - Dactyloidae
            - Polychrus
      - - Hoplocercidae
        - - Crotaphytidae
          - Iguanidae
        - - Leiocephalus carinatus
          - Liolaemidae
          - - Microlophus albemarlensis
            - Phrynosomatidae
            - Tropiduridae
    - Corytophanidae
      - Basiliscus spp.
      - - †Geiseltaliellus maarius
        - - Corytophanes spp.
          - - †Babibasiliscus alxi
            - Laemanctus spp.
