= Casque (anatomy) =

Anatomical feature in birds

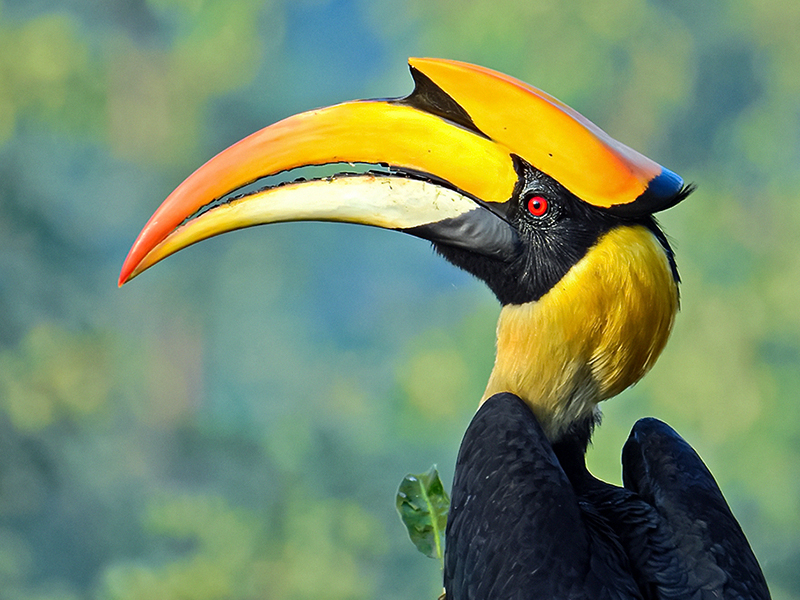
Like most hornbills, this male great hornbill has a distinctive casque on its upper mandible.

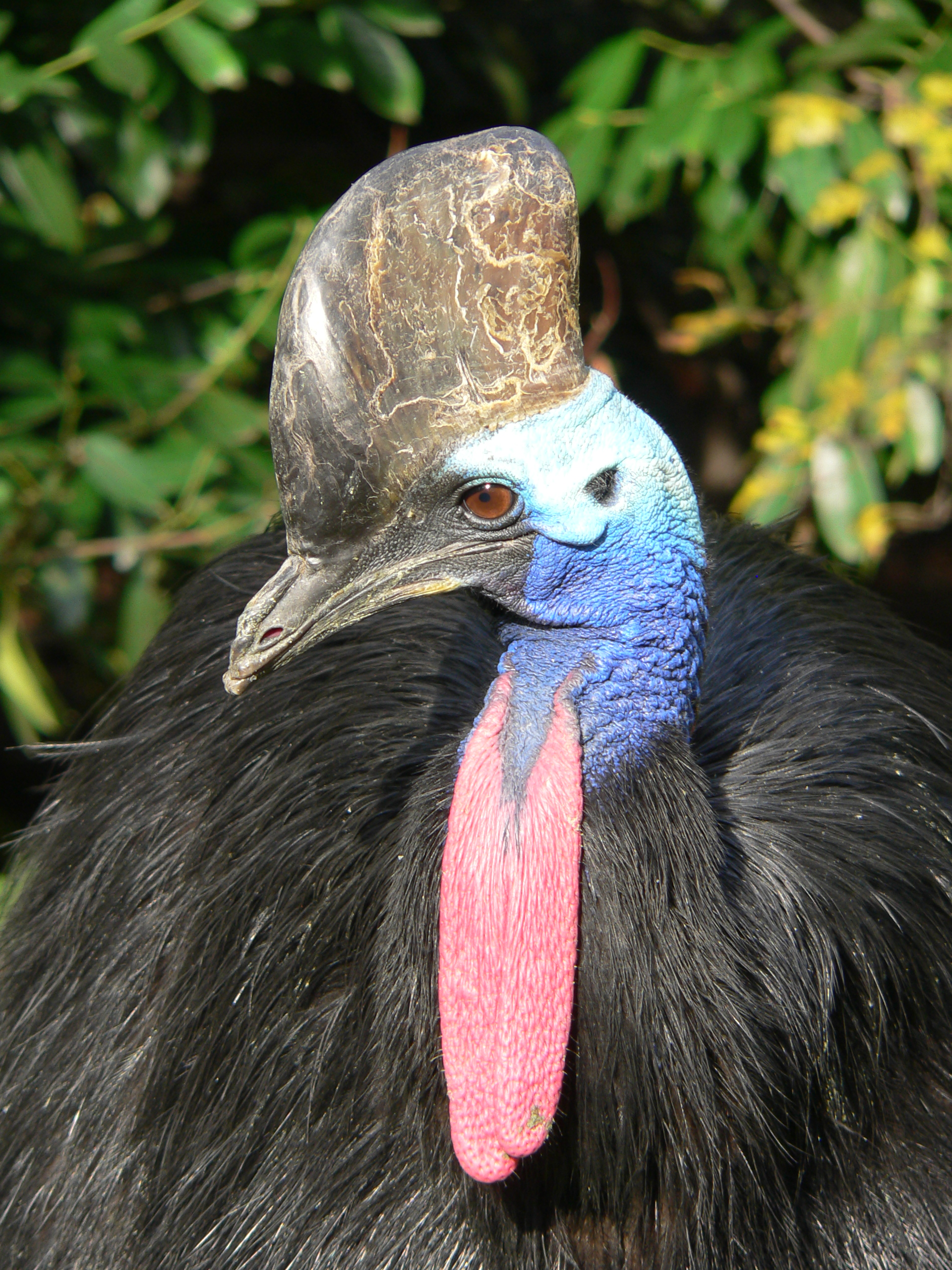
The bony, vascularized casque of the southern cassowary helps the bird to shed excess heat.

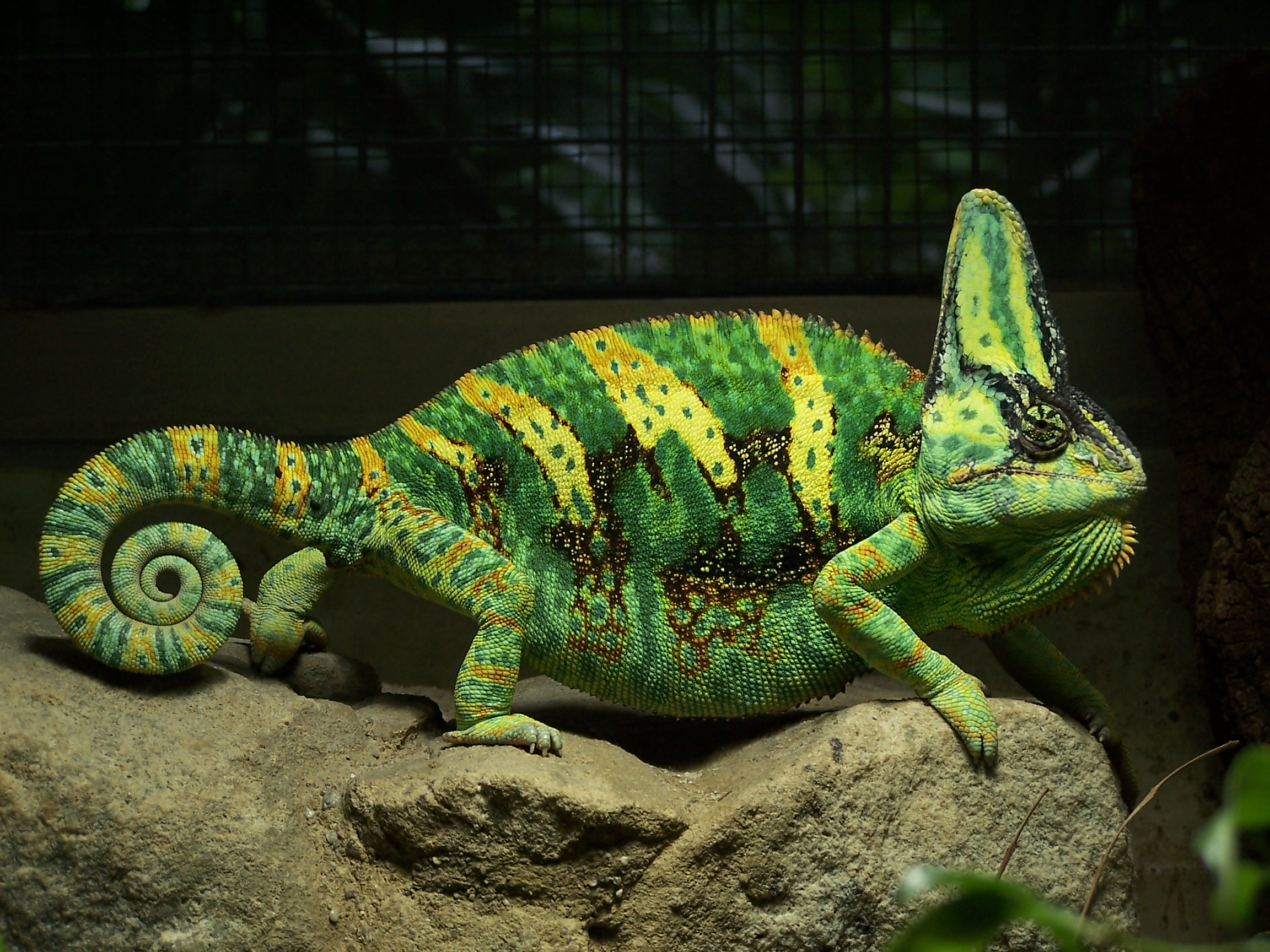
The high casque of the veiled chameleon provides an expanded area for the attachment of jaw musculature – and may also help the animal to collect moisture or store fat.

A casque is an anatomical feature found in some species of birds, reptiles, and amphibians. In birds, it is an enlargement of the bones of the upper mandible or the skull, either on the front of the face, the top of the head, or both. The casque has been hypothesized to serve as a visual cue to a bird's sex, state of maturity, or social status; as reinforcement to the beak's structure; or as a resonance chamber, enhancing calls. In addition, they may be used in combat with other members of the same species, in the gathering of food, or in thermoregulation.

== Birds ==
=== Structure ===
Casques are found in a number of species, including most hornbills, all cassowaries, the maleo, the horned guan, the helmeted guineafowl and several species of curassow. In most of these species, the casque is a bony extension of the upper mandible or skull that is covered with a cornified layer of skin. However, in cassowaries, a foamy, elastic layer of collagen sits between the bone and the skin. Hornbill casques grow from an area of vascularized tissue at the front of the skull. In most species, the casque is primarily hollow, with a network of bony filaments at the posterior end. The structure starts small in youngsters and develops over time, and at maturity is typically larger in males than in females. For larger species with larger casques, the growth process may take as long as six years. In general, if male and female casques of a species are similarly sized, then they tend to be differently colored, and if they are similarly colored, they tend to be differently sized. Hornbill species that live in dry, open areas tend to have smaller casques than those that live in forested areas.

=== Functions ===
Casques may serve different functions in different species, and may serve multiple functions in a single species. In the hornbills, the casques of males and females of each species differ in size, shape, structure, and color, and the casques of young birds are different than those of adults. These various differences may aid in the recognition of potential mates or competitors. Casques on the bill, particularly those that run the length, or nearly the length, of the culmen, may help to strengthen a long, curved beak, which can allow a stronger bite force at the bill's tip.

Some species use their casques for fighting with other members of the same species. Male helmeted hornbills, for example, clash their casques together in mid-air combats that can last up to two hours. Male great hornbills also bash their casques together, sometimes in aerial combat, sometimes while one of the two birds is perched. Indian grey hornbills casque-butt both in aerial battles, and in clashes between perched and flying birds. While most instances involve two males, clashes can also occur between members of a mated pair.

Heat exchange is a primary function of cassowary casques. Studies have shown that the casques efficiently shed heat at high temperatures and help to restrict heat loss at lower temperatures. Cassowaries have been seen dunking their casques into water when temperatures were high. Some theories that have been advanced in the past for cassowary casques – that they provide a "helmet" to protect the birds' heads as they move through the forest, that they serve as a "shovel" during foraging, or that they are used during fights with conspecifics – have now been largely discounted due to a lack of field observations confirming those uses.

=== Problems and threats ===
Casques are regularly subject to injury and disease. Injury can be either self-induced, or caused by conspecifics or environmental factors. Invasive squamous cell carcinoma is a common issue, particularly in the great hornbill. Rhinoceros hornbills and helmeted hornbills have long been hunted for their casques, which are used for carvings. Items made from hornbill ivory date back more than 2000 years in Borneo and more than 1000 years in China. Helmeted hornbills are particularly sought, as their casques are densely solid. Although they are protected by law throughout their range, they are killed at unsustainable rates; between 2011 and 2014, for example, more than 1100 skulls were seized from poachers in Indonesia's Kalimantan region alone.

== Reptiles ==
A number of chameleon species have casques, which in these reptiles are bony protrusions on the top of the head. In species which have casques, males tend to have significantly larger casques than females. Studies have shown that casques are used for communication, including the indication of fighting ability. In some species, the size of the casque accurately predicts the bite strength of the individual. The casques form an attachment point for musculature; bigger casques have a larger area for muscle attachment, which can result in a stronger bite. The veiled chameleon of the arid stretches of southern Saudi Arabia and Yemen has a particularly large casque, which scientists have theorised may be used to collect moisture or store fat.

Casqueheaded lizards in the family Corytophanidae have expanded parietal bones. In the genera Corytophanes and Laemanctus, these modifications are present in both sexes; the thickened bones allow for greater bite strength as there is more area for muscle attachment. This may allow these species to utilize larger prey with more chitinous exoskeletons. In species of the genus Basiliscus, on the other hand, males have much larger parietal crests than females. However, the underlying bones are thin and elongated. Their enlarged crests are used in display; large crests can make the animal appear bigger. Females preferentially choose larger males, and larger males are more successful in aggressive encounters with other males.

== See also ==
- Comb (anatomy)
- Crest (feathers)
- Frontal shield
- Neck frill
- Snood (anatomy)
- Wattle (anatomy)
