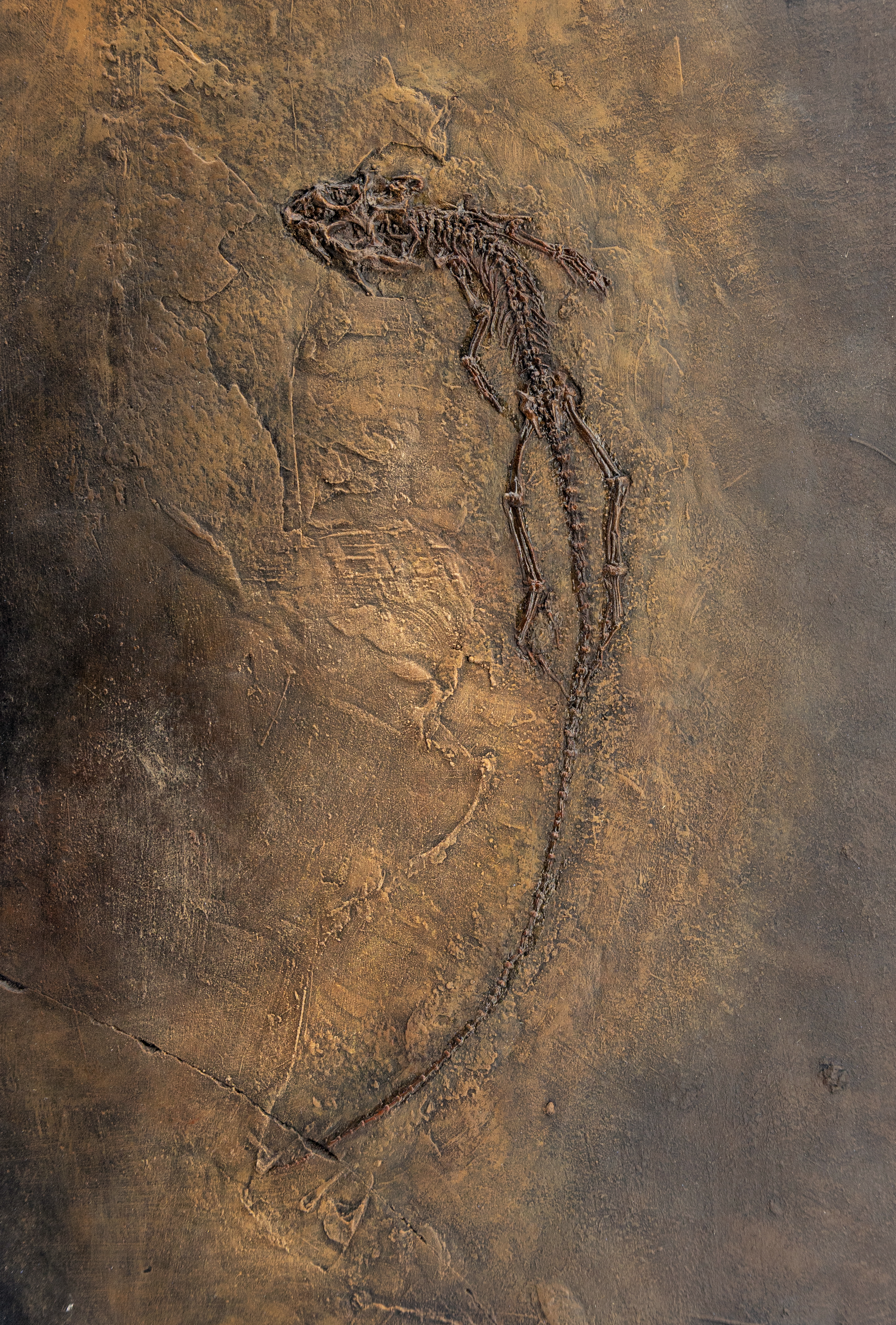
- G. longicaudatus, Royal Tyrrell Museum of Palaeontology

Scientific classification
- Kingdom: Animalia
- Phylum: Chordata
- Class: Reptilia
- Order: Squamata
- Suborder: Iguania
- Family: Corytophanidae
- Genus: †Geiseltaliellus; Kuhn, 1944

Species
- †G. grisolli Augé, 2005 †G. lamandini (Filhol, 1877) †G. longicaudus Kuhn, 1944 (type) †G. maarius Smith, 2009

Synonyms
- Genus-level: Capitolacerta Kuhn, 1944; Species-level: G. louisi Augé, 1990; Capitolacerta dubia Kuhn, 1944

= Geiseltaliellus =

Geiseltaliellus Temporal range: Eocene

Extinct genus of lizards

Geiseltaliellus is an extinct genus of iguanian lizards that lived in what is now western Europe during the Eocene. It belongs to the family Corytophanidae, which includes modern casquehead lizards. Many fossils are known from Germany, France, and Belgium, with the most well preserved coming from the Messel pit lagerstätte in Messel, Germany. German paleontologist Oskar Kuhn named the genus in 1944 after the Geiseltal valley where the first specimens were found, designating the type species Geiseltaliellus longicaudus. Three new species — G. louisi, G. lamandini, and G. grisolli — were named in the 1990s and 2000s on the basis of more fragmentary remains from France and Belgium, although G. louisi has since been synonymized with G. longicaudus. In 2009 the Messel pit specimens were recognized as belonging to a species distinct from that of the G. longicaudus specimens in Geiseltalt and were collectively reclassified under a new name, G. maarius.

== Description ==
Geiseltaliellus is very similar in appearance to modern corytophanid lizards of the genus Corytophanes and Basiliscus. One species, G. maarius, even possesses a prominent crest on its head like that of Basiliscus. Well-preserved specimens of Geiseltaliellus shows that it had a similar scale pattern to living corytophanids, with large scales covering the top of the skull, smaller overlapping scales covering most of the body, and wide scales covering the toes. The tail of Geiseltaliellus is very long; although corytophanids are known to have long tails in comparison to other lizards, the tail of Geiseltaliellus is proportionally much longer than those of most other corytophanids, being two to three times the length of the rest of the body. The limbs are proportioned similarly to those of living corytophanids in that the hind limbs are long and the forelimbs are short, adaptations that may have made Geiseltaliellus an effective jumper and sprinter like the living Basiliscus.

== Behavior ==
The long legs, short arms, and long tail of Geiseltaliellus would have made it both an effective facultative biped on the ground and climber in trees. Living corytophanids share these features but spend most of their time in trees, with only the juveniles of some species spending significant time on the ground. Long penultimate phalanges (second-to-last toe bones) in Geiseltaliellus, which are common to many other arboreal animals because they allow for better grip on branches, suggest that like living corytophanids it was primarily arboreal rather than terrestrial. This hypothesis fits with the inferred paleoenvironment of the Messel Pit during the Eocene, which was a dense forest.

Living members of the genus Basiliscus are well known for their ability to sprint across the surface of water. Geiseltaliellus likely did not have this ability because it lacked the enlarged scales on the undersides of the feet of Basiliscus, which give it greater surface area.

== Phylogeny ==
Comparison of multiple corytophanid skulls (G. maarius in E)

Geiseltaliellus belongs to Pleurodonta, one of the two major clades or evolutionary groupings within the larger group Iguania. The other clade is called Acrodonta. Today Pleurodonta and Acrodonta have a nearly disjunct distribution - Pleurodonta is mostly restricted to the New World while Acrodonta is restricted to the Old World. The presence of Geiseltaliellus in Europe indicates that the range of Pleurodonta was not always as restricted as it is currently. However, the closest relatives of Geiseltaliellus all come from North America, suggesting that the genus had its origins in the New World and became an evolutionary "dead end" once it radiated into Europe.

G. maarius was included in a phylogenetic analysis of living and extinct iguanians in 2009, which found it to be a member of Corytophanidae. Below is a cladogram showing the results of that analysis:

- Iguania
  - - †Priscagama gobiensis
    - Acrodonta
  - Pleurodonta
    - - Crotaphytidae
      - - - Hoplocercidae
          - Iguanidae
        - - Polychrotidae
          - Corytophanidae
            - - †Geiseltaliellus maarius
              - unnamed Early Eocene iguanian
            - - Basiliscus basiliscus
              - - Corytophanes cristatus
                - Laemanctus longipes
    - - Phrynosomatidae
      - - Opluridae
        - Tropiduridae
