= Marwell Zoo =

Zoo in Hampshire, England

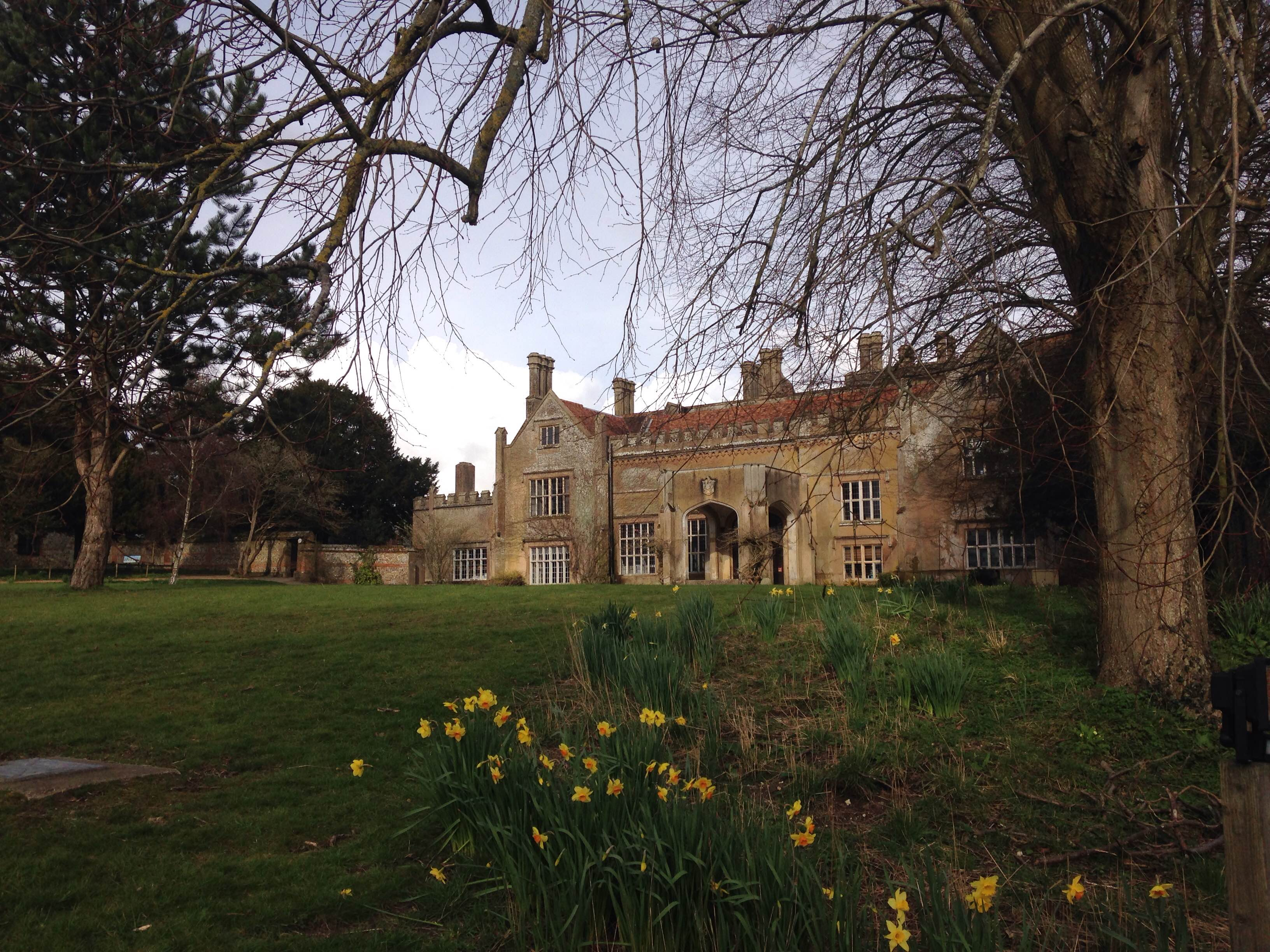
- Marwell Hall, March 2016
- Interactive map of Marwell Zoo
- 50°59′35.39″N 1°16′39.85″W
- Date opened: 1972
- Location: Owslebury, Hampshire, England, United Kingdom
- Land area: 140 acres (57 ha)
- No. of animals: 1208+ (2019)
- No. of species: 149 (2019)
- Annual visitors: 488,557 (2025)
- Memberships: BIAZA, EAZA, WAZA, IUCN
- Major exhibits: Roof of the World, Into Africa, Heart of Africa, Life in the Trees, Wild Explorers, African Valley, Fur-Feathers-Scales, Energy For Life: Tropical House, Aridlands
- Website: www.marwell.org.uk

Listed Building – Grade I
- Official name: Marwell Hall
- Designated: 5 December 1955
- Reference no.: 1350871

Marwell Zoo is a 140-acre (57 ha) zoo situated in Colden Common near Winchester, in the English county of Hampshire. It is owned and run by the registered charity Marwell Wildlife. The zoo is home to over 500 animals of 145 species. The charity undertakes a range of educational and conservation activities, with a particular focus on Africa in addition to work from its base.

== History ==
The zoo was founded by Dr John Knowles, opening in 1972. He sold a Rolls-Royce of his to buy some zebras. It was one of the earliest zoos in Europe to place an emphasis on animal conservation. Within a few years of its establishment, it became an important breeding centre for several species, some (e.g. the Mongolian wild horse) already extinct in the wild, others (e.g. the snow leopard and Siberian tiger) close to extinction.

The park is situated in the estate of Marwell Hall, a Grade I listed building originally built around the year 1320 by Walter Woodlock and largely rebuilt in 1816 by William Long. In the 16th century, the Hall belonged to the Seymour family, and there is a local legend that Henry VIII courted Jane Seymour there. Between September 1941 and March 1944, Cunliffe-Owen Aircraft used the area (part of the managing director's personal estate) as an airfield to support the manufacture of military aircraft at its nearby factory in Eastleigh. After the end of World War II, the area was returned to agricultural use until the establishment of the zoo.

In 1977, a giraffe called Victor tore a muscle in his leg, collapsed on his stomach, and was unable to get up. The press suggested that he had slipped while trying to mate and compared his situation to the splits. All attempts to get him on his feet failed, and his plight became a major international news story. Portsmouth Dockyard made a hoist to attempt to raise him onto his feet. He died of a heart attack very shortly afterward in the arms of his keeper Ruth. The publicity turned Marwell into a major tourist attraction, and interest was revived the following summer, when Victor's mate, Dribbles, gave birth to a female calf named Victoria.

In the late 1980s, a number of scimitar-horned oryx and nyala antelope were transported from Marwell Zoo to the Pearl Coast Zoological Gardens in Broome, Western Australia. The Pearl Coast Zoo was a project of Lord Alistair McAlpine, opened in 1984.

In 1991 Dr John Knowles was appointed an OBE for services to conservation.

In 1999, the zoo lost all of its penguins (22 African and 5 macaroni) to avian malaria. There were other cases in the UK but Marwell was the only zoo to lose its entire colony, which had arrived only two and a half years before to stock the new Penguin World exhibit. After consulting with experts, the exhibit was restocked with Humboldt penguins, which whilst endangered in the wild, are present in greater numbers in captivity.

In 2003, after constructing a new enclosure for critically endangered Amur leopards, a female leopard (Jade) escaped and fell from a tree to her death after being shot with a tranquiliser dart only days before the official opening of the exhibit. Following a replacement after the death of Jade, in 2005 the first cub born to the new Amur leopard pair, Amirah, escaped into the male's enclosure and was killed by her father. On 18 November 2007, a female Amur leopard cub (named Kiska following a public vote) was born as a result of a European Conservation Breeding Programme.

Both the park and charity changed their name to "Marwell Wildlife" in April 2009, to promote awareness of conservation work beyond the park. The charity had previously been called the Marwell Preservation Trust, and the park had been Marwell Zoological Park.

In August 2022 another female giraffe died unexpectedly. In September 2024 a Giraffe calf had died from a disease just a month after its birth

== Animal exhibits ==
The park includes a number of themed areas, including:

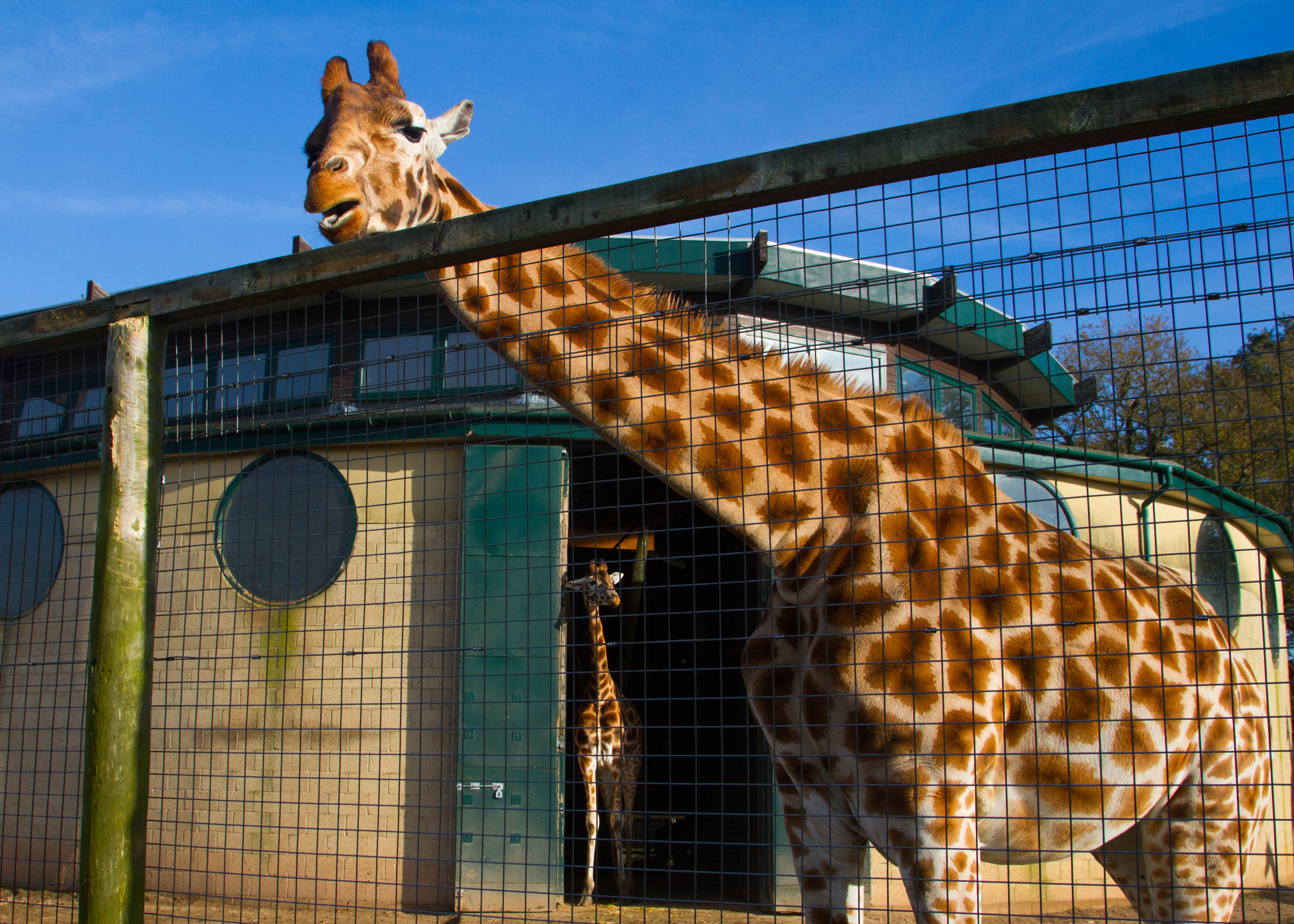
Giraffe

- Roof of the World is themed along the Himalayan mountain range.
- Lemur Loop is a walkthrough exhibit that opened in 2017.
- Penguin Cove was refurbished in 2012 and was home to 14 Humboldt penguins in 2021.

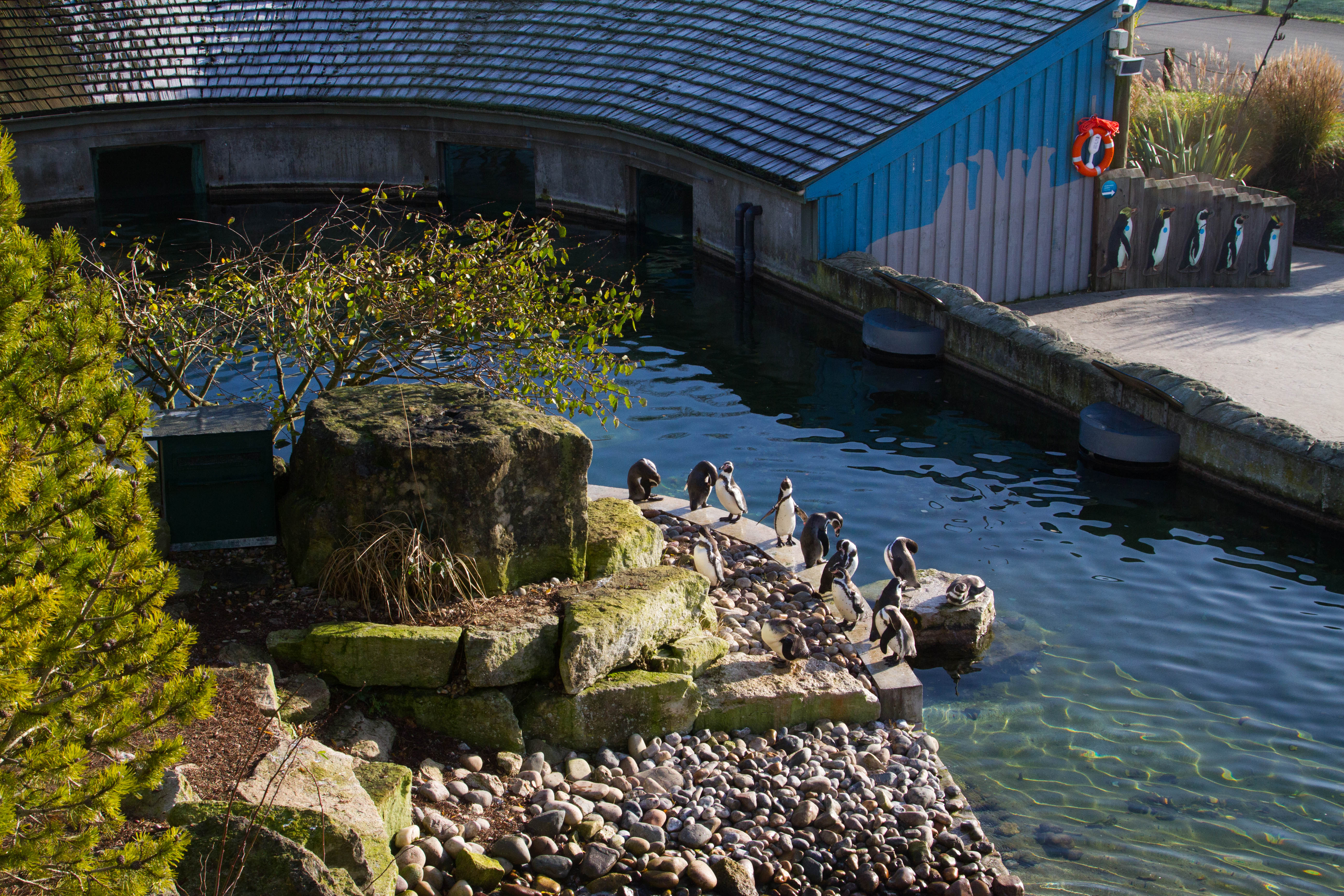
Penguin Cove

- Aridlands
- Fur, Feathers & Scales, formerly Australian Brush Walk was redeveloped in 2015

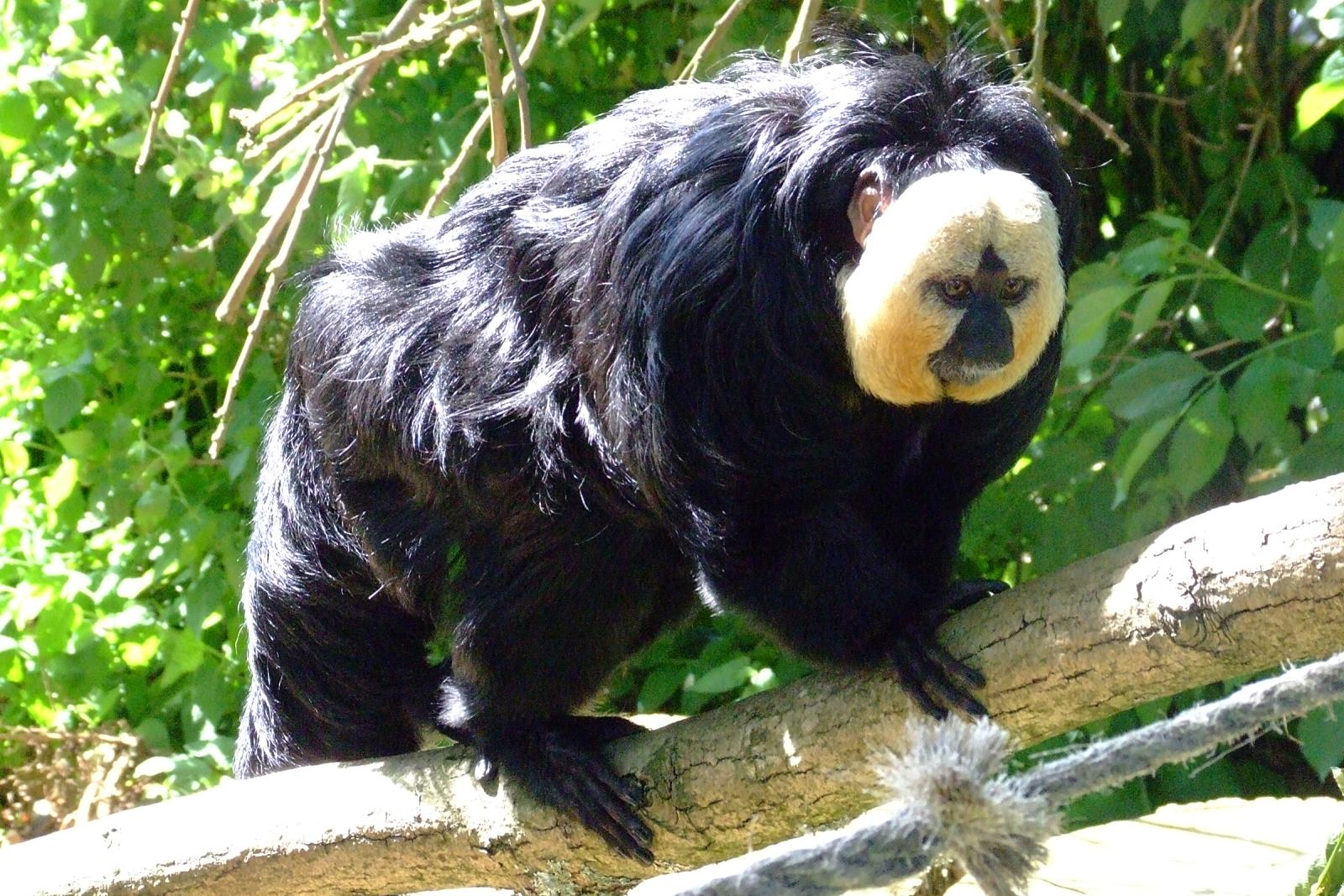
A male white-faced saki

=== Mammals ===
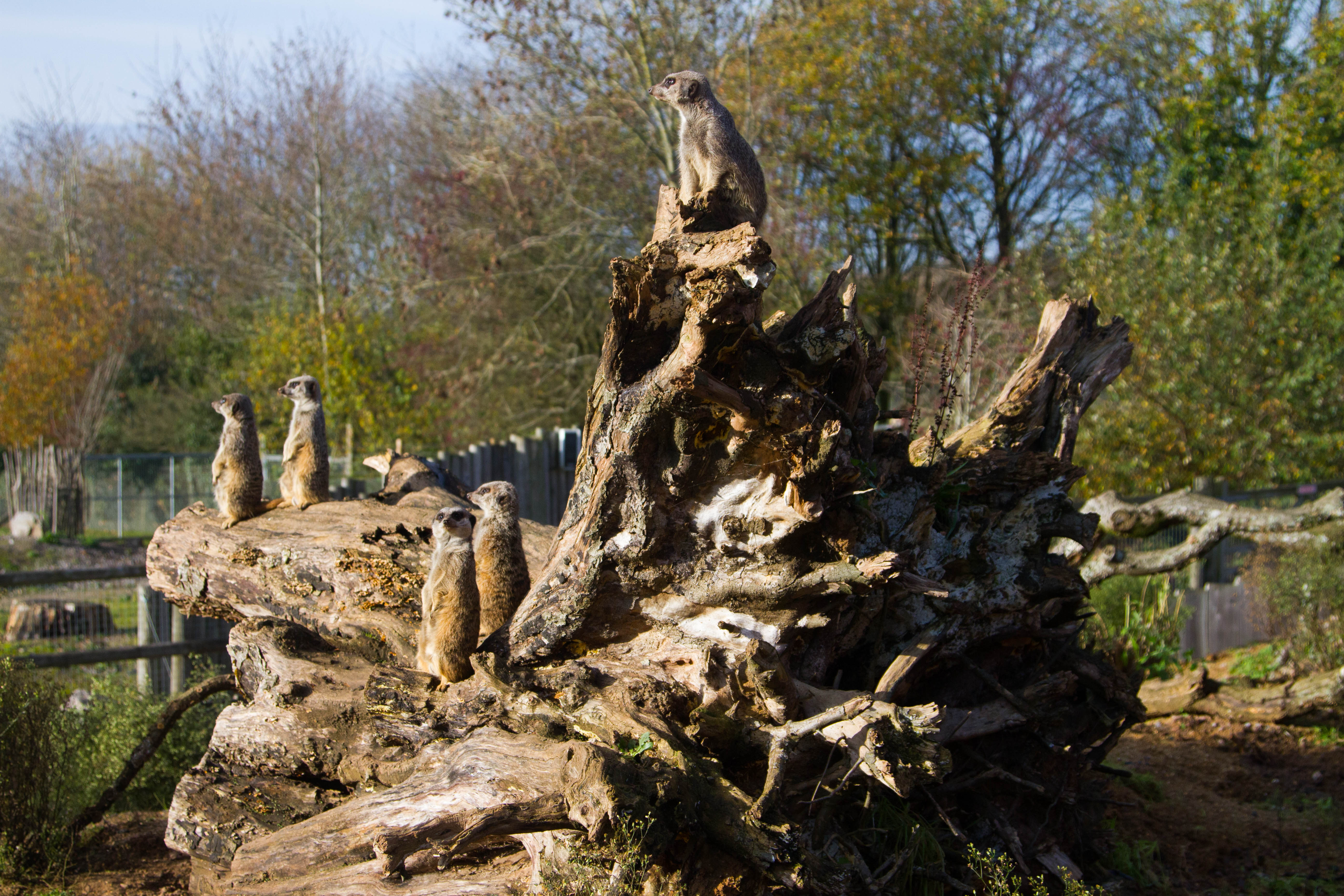
Meerkats

Mammals in the zoo's collection include bearded emperor tamarins, binturongs, common kusimanse, coppery titi monkeys, cotton-headed tamarins, crowned lemurs, golden lion tamarins, golden-headed lion tamarins, Linne's two-toed sloths, long-nosed potoroos, meerkats, narrow-striped mongoose, pygmy marmosets, red pandas, red ruffed lemurs, red-bellied lemurs, red-necked wallabies, ring-tailed lemurs, rock hyraxes, servals, siamangs, snow leopards, white-faced saki and yellow mongooses.

=== Birds ===
Birds in the zoo's collection include Asian fairy-bluebirds, blue-crowned laughingthrushes, blue-faced honeyeaters, Brazilian tanagers, common ostriches, crested partridges, Fischer's turacos, greater flamingos, hamerkops, Humboldt penguins, Sclater's crowned pigeons, southern caracaras, swift parrots and village weavers.

=== Reptiles and amphibians ===
Reptiles and amphibians in the zoo's collection include casquehead iguanas, crocodile monitors, Egyptian tortoises, emerald tree monitors, emerald tree skinks, Gila monsters, Mexican beaded lizards, northern curly-tailed lizards, Rio Cauca caecilians, Roti Island snake-necked turtles, rough-scaled plated lizards, royal pythons, Solomon Islands skinks, starry agamas, Utila spiny-tailed iguanas, and yellow-throated frogs.

== Conservation ==
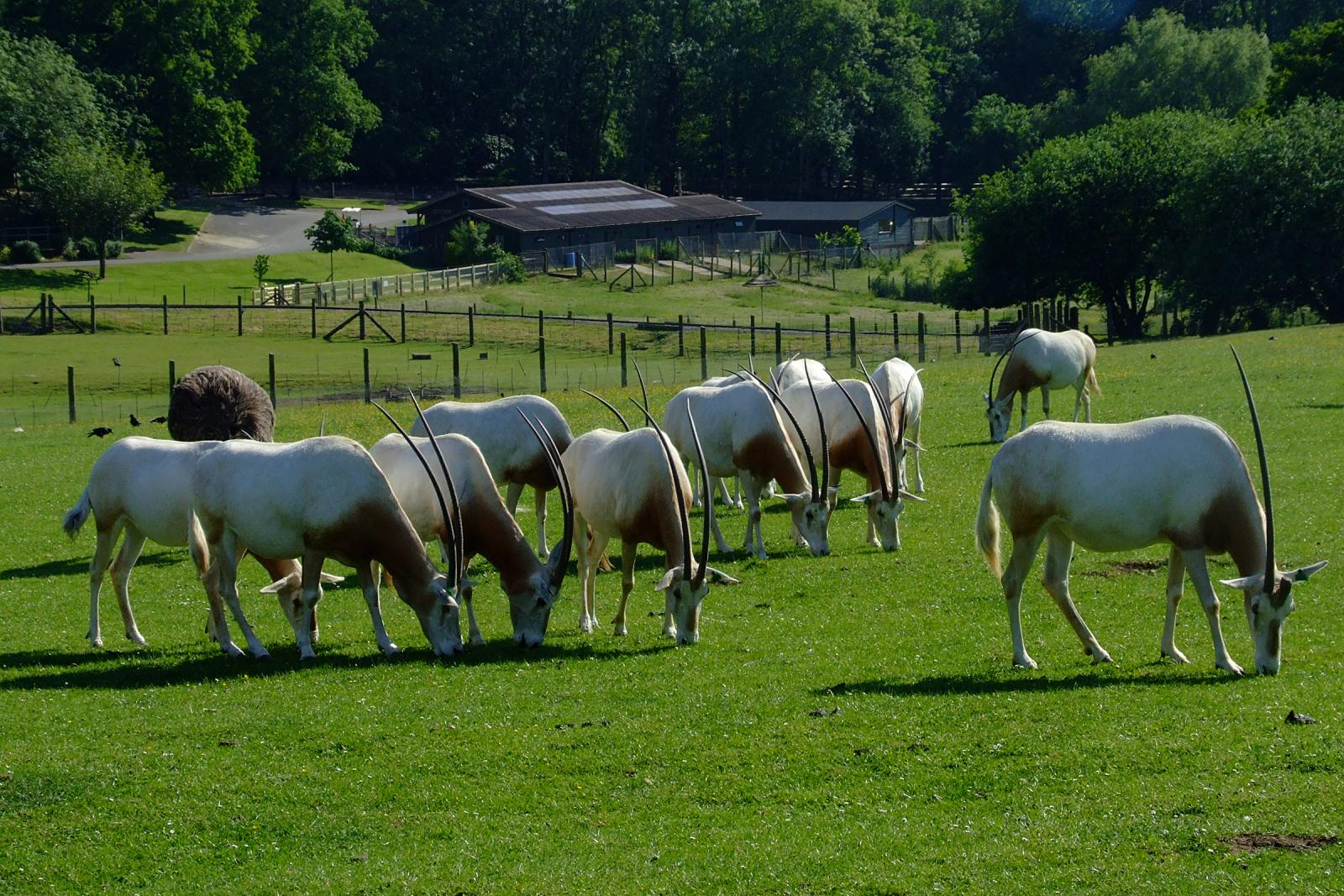
A herd of scimitar oryxes grazing

In 2012 Marwell Wildlife conservation programmes included Managing Biodiversity in Hampshire, assisting Grevy's zebra and its ecosystem in Kenya; supporting threatened species in Zimbabwe and managing the population of small, vulnerable populations; and reintroducing the scimitar-horned oryx to the Sahara.

The zoo has been involved in reintroducing wild horses, golden lion tamarins, roan antelopes and scimitar-horned oryxes to the wild. The oryx was extinct in the wild, but more than 200 calves have been born and reared at the zoo since 1972 and many of these have been released back to the Sahara with animals from Whipsnade Zoo and Edinburgh Zoo.

The charity carries out a range of research and education activities and provides the office for the IUCN antelope specialist group.

Marwell Zoo has had notable success breeding various endangered animals including: black and white ruffed lemurs (critically endangered), scimitar-horned oryxes, Amur leopards (critically endangered) and snow leopards. In July 2015 a critically endangered Sulawesi-crested macaque baby was born.

October 2018 saw the birth of a Hartmann's mountain zebra at the zoo. First time mother, Dorotka, is genetically very important to the European population and the last successful breeding of the vulnerable species at the zoo was back in 1997. On 24th February 2021, a Javan Chevrotain was born at the zoo.

== Facilities ==
The family attraction additionally includes five children's playgrounds, various food kiosks, two indoor picnic lodges, and Bushtucker Bites, as well as picnic areas on Marwell Hall lawn and various other areas across the zoo. There is a hotel adjacent to the park.

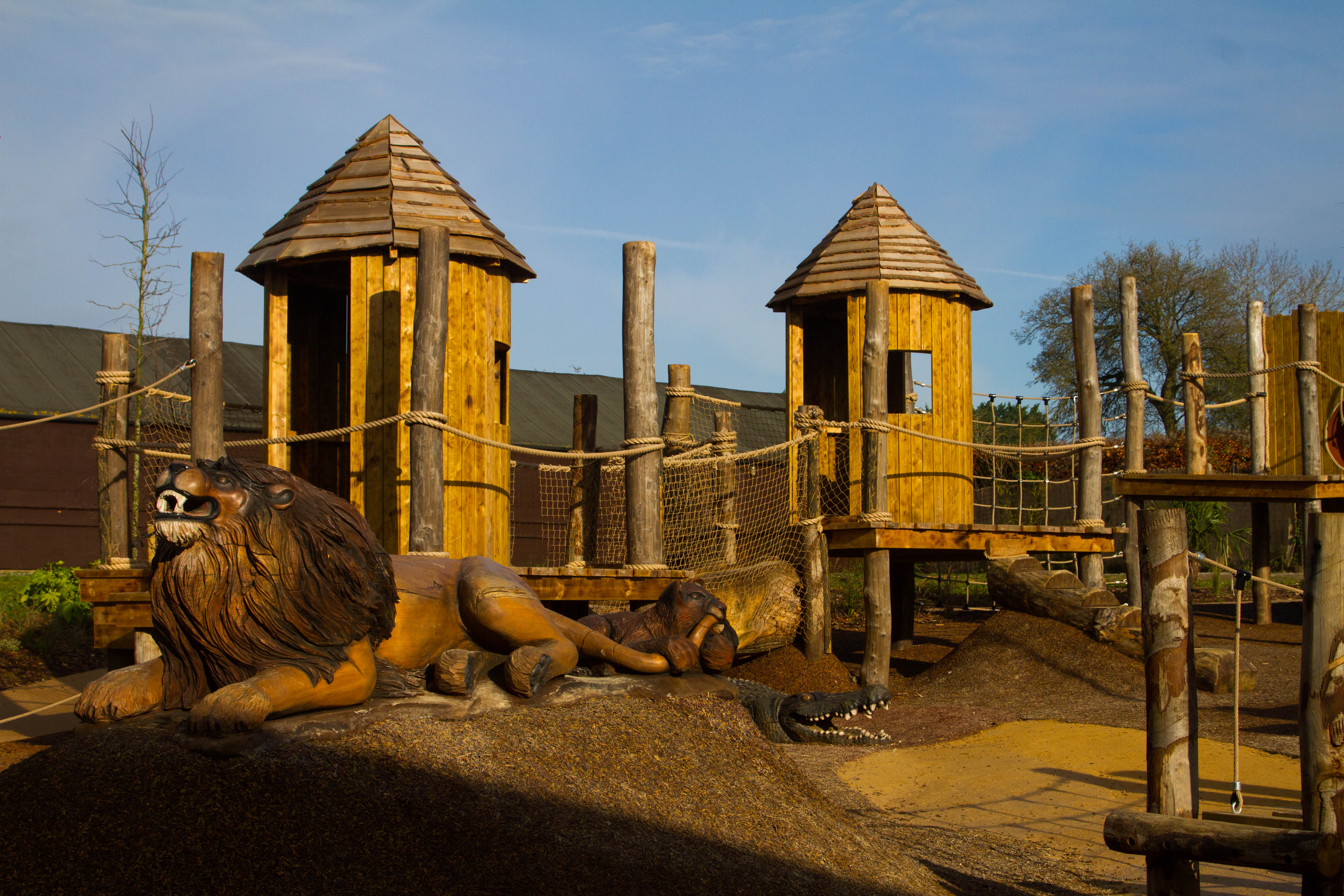
Wild Explorers Playground at Marwell Zoo, Hampshire, England

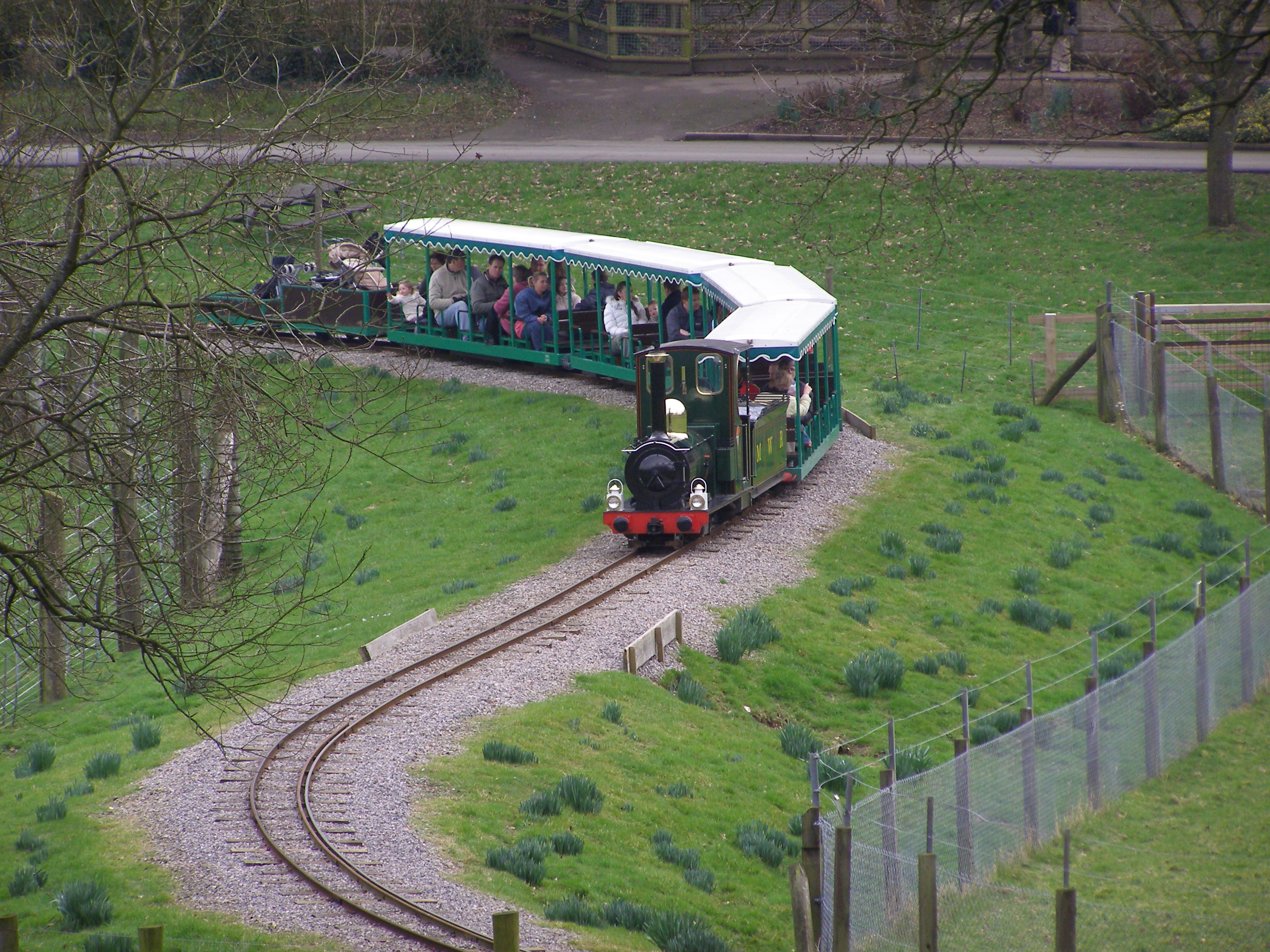
Marwell Wildlife Railway

The Marwell Wildlife Railway (MWR), was a 15 in (381 mm) gauge railway operating around the front half of the zoo site. It was commonly known as Marwell Zoo Railway, although its locomotive is lettered MWR to reflect the former name. The line ran for a little less than a kilometre, and was served by two stations, Treetops Junction and Park End Halt. The line opened in 1987 and operated using the original rolling stock. It operated daily during school holidays, and at weekends for the rest of the spring, summer, and autumn, but ceased operating in 2022

Rolling stock on the railway was supplied by Severn Lamb. The only locomotive was a 2-6-0DH steam-outline locomotive named Princess Anne. There were four passenger coaches, each capable of seating 16 adult passengers. The coaches were roofed, but open-sided. There was a 4-wheel open wagon for maintenance trains.

== Sources ==
- Bonser, Phil (1988). Pearl Coast Zoo - Broome, Western Australia. Broome: Phil Bonser Research and Presentation Pty Ltd. ISBN 0-7316-2605-2.
