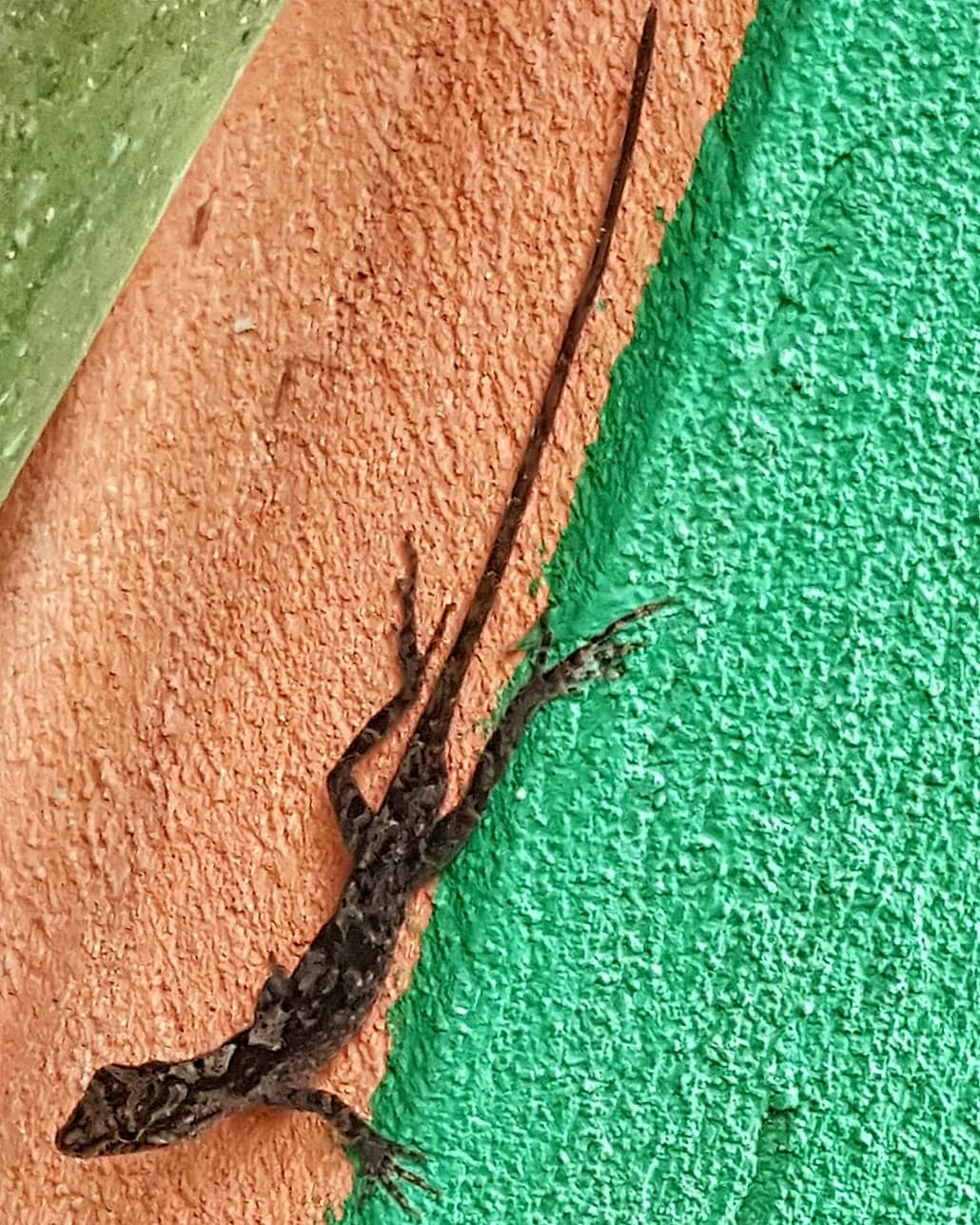

Scientific classification
- Kingdom: Animalia
- Phylum: Chordata
- Class: Reptilia
- Order: Squamata
- Suborder: Iguania
- Family: Dactyloidae
- Genus: Anolis
- Species: A. schiedei

Binomial name
- Anolis schiedei (Wiegmann, 1834)

= Anolis schiedei =

Species of lizard

Anolis schiedei, commonly known as Schiede's anole, is a species of lizard in the family Dactyloidae. It is found in Mexico.
