= Suzanniwana =

Suzanniwana Temporal range: Early Eocene, 56 Ma

Scientific classification
- Domain: Eukaryota
- Kingdom: Animalia
- Phylum: Chordata
- Class: Reptilia
- Order: Squamata
- Suborder: Iguania
- Clade: Pleurodonta
- Genus: †Suzanniwana; Smith, 2009

Species
- †S. patriciana Smith, 2009 (type) †S. revenanta Smith and Gauthier, 2013

Extinct genus of lizards

Suzanniwana is an extinct genus of iguanian lizards that lived in western North America during the earliest Eocene, approximately 56 million years ago. Two species are known from the Bighorn Basin of Wyoming: the type species S. patriciana named in 2009, and the species S. revenanta named in 2013. Suzanniwana lived during the Paleocene–Eocene Thermal Maximum, a brief period of global warming that resulted in warmer and drier conditions in the Bighorn Basin. It likely stemmed from a lineage that had migrated into the basin from regions farther to the south, following a latitudinal band of constant climatic conditions that moved northward as the planet warmed (a phenomenon known as habitat tracking). Suzanniwana shares many skeletal features with modern casquehead lizards of the family Corytophanidae and may be a stem-corytophanid. It also closely resembles Geiseltaliellus, an iguanian from the middle Eocene Messel pit in Germany.
