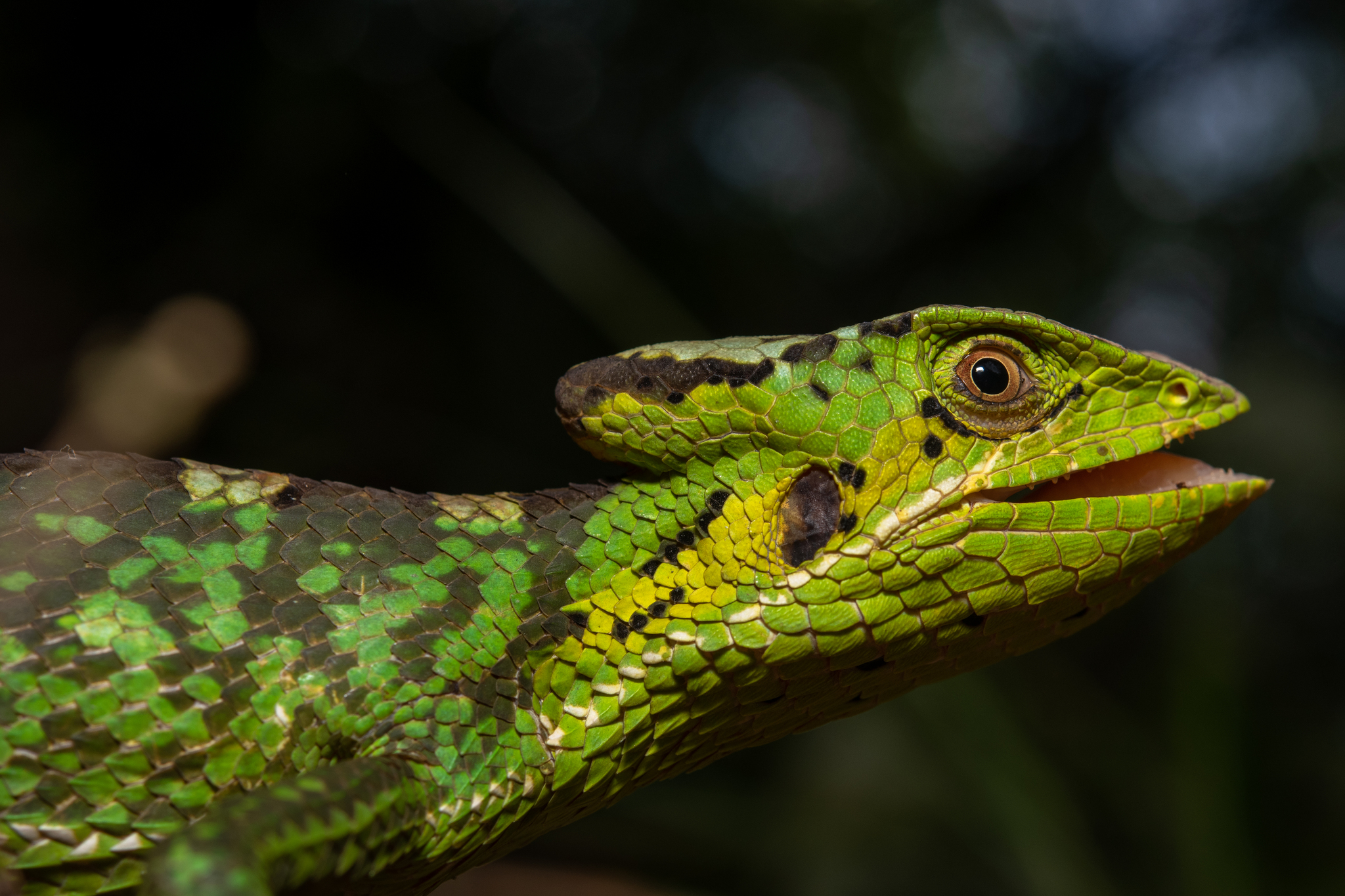

Scientific classification
- Kingdom: Animalia
- Phylum: Chordata
- Class: Reptilia
- Order: Squamata
- Suborder: Iguania
- Family: Corytophanidae
- Genus: Laemanctus
- Species: L. waltersi

Binomial name
- Laemanctus waltersi Schmidt, 1933

Synonyms
- Laemanctus waltersi Schmidt, 1933; Laemanctus longipes waltersi — McCoy, 1968; Laemanctus waltersi — McCranie, 2015

= Laemanctus waltersi =

Species of lizard

Laemanctus waltersi, also known commonly as Walters' casquehead iguana or Walters's casquehead iguana, is a species of lizard in the family Corytophanidae. The species is endemic to Honduras.

== Etymology ==
The specific name, waltersi, is in honor of taxidermist Leon L. Walters, who collected the holotype with Karl Schmidt.

== Geographic range ==
L. waltersi is found in northwestern Honduras.

== Reproduction ==
L. waltersi is oviparous.
