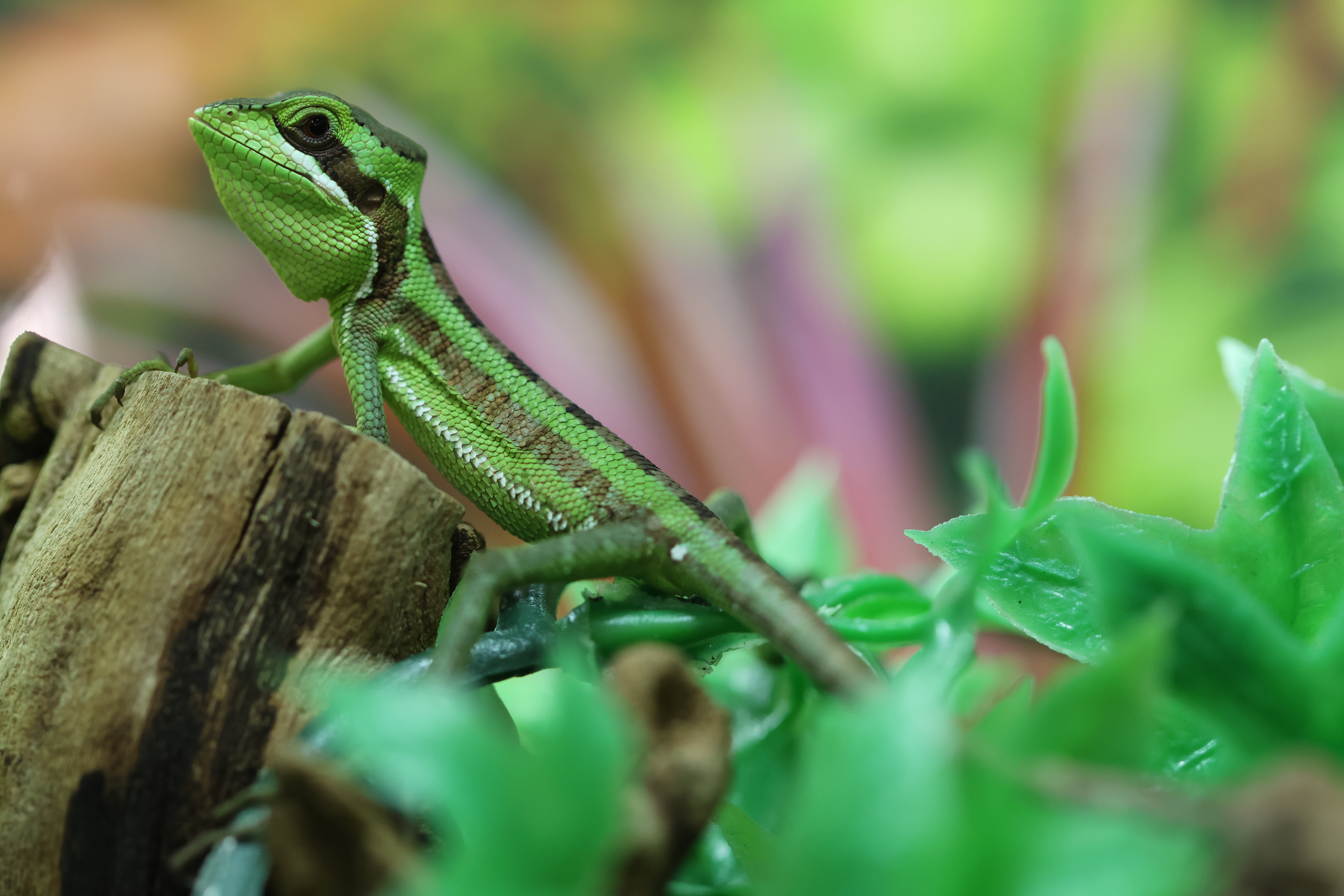

Scientific classification
- Kingdom: Animalia
- Phylum: Chordata
- Class: Reptilia
- Order: Squamata
- Suborder: Iguania
- Family: Corytophanidae
- Genus: Laemanctus
- Species: L. julioi

Binomial name
- Laemanctus julioi McCranie, 2018

= Laemanctus julioi =

Species of lizard

Laemanctus julioi, also known commonly as Julio's casquehead iguana, is a species of lizard in the family Corytophanidae. The species is endemic to Honduras.

== Etymology ==
The specific name, julioi, is in honor of Honduran zoologist Julio Enrique Mérida.

== Geographic range ==
L. julioi is found in southcentral Honduras, at altitudes of 650–1,000 m (2,130–3,280 ft).

== Behavior ==
L. julioi is diurnal.

== Reproduction ==
L. julioi is oviparous. Eggs are laid in May and June.
