= Brown basilisk =

Conservation status
- Least Concern (IUCN 3.1)

Scientific classification
- Kingdom: Animalia
- Phylum: Chordata
- Class: Reptilia
- Order: Squamata
- Suborder: Iguania
- Family: Corytophanidae
- Genus: Basiliscus
- Species: B. vittatus

Binomial name
- Basiliscus vittatus Wiegmann, 1828

Species of lizard

The brown basilisk (Basiliscus vittatus), also commonly referred to as the striped basilisk, is a species of basilisk lizard in the family Corytophanidae. The species is native to Mexico, Central America and adjacent northwestern Colombia, and has been introduced into the U.S. state of Florida as an invasive species. The brown basilisk has large hind feet with narrow flaps of skin on the distal edge of each toe. The fact that it moves quickly across water gives it the appearance of "walking on water".

== Description ==
The male brown basilisk can reach 61 centimetres (24 in) in total length (including tail), but the female is somewhat smaller. It has a three-part dorsal crest on the head, along the back, and along the tail. Coloration is brown or olive brown with black crossbands. The crossbands are usually only on the flanks and on the dorsal crest. There is also a white stripe, which extends from the eyes to the rear legs. The male has a larger crest than the female. The brown basilisk weighs 200–600 g (0.44–1.32 lb). It has long toes with sharp claws.

== Etymology and taxonomy ==
The brown basilisk's generic name Basiliscus is taken from the creature of Greek mythology made up of parts of a rooster, snake, and lion that could turn a man to stone by its gaze: the basilisk. This name derives from the Greek basilískos (βασιλίσκος) meaning "little king". This generic name was given in Carl Linnaeus' 10th edition of Systema Naturae.

== Running on water ==
Smaller brown basilisks can run about 10–20 m (33–66 ft) on the water without sinking. Young brown basilisks can usually run further than older ones. If the animal faces danger, it starts to run very fast on the surface of a river or a lake. The flaps on its hind feet are then opened and thus more surface area is provided for it to run on water.

== Behavior ==
Basiliscus vittatus is in the same infraorder as the family Iguanidae. Like most reptiles, the brown basilisk is active during the day. Its outstanding camouflage allows it to remain motionless and very hard to detect. The maximum lifespan of the brown basilisk is probably around 7–8 years. In the wild, most die much sooner.

== Reproduction ==
Female brown basilisks lay about 2–18 eggs, five to eight times a year. Eggs hatch after about three months and the babies weigh around 2 g (0.071 oz). It is hypothesized that they reproduce year-round, but males exhibit a peak in spermatogenic activity during the dry season and a peak in insemination and/or copulation at the beginning of the rainy season.

== Gallery ==
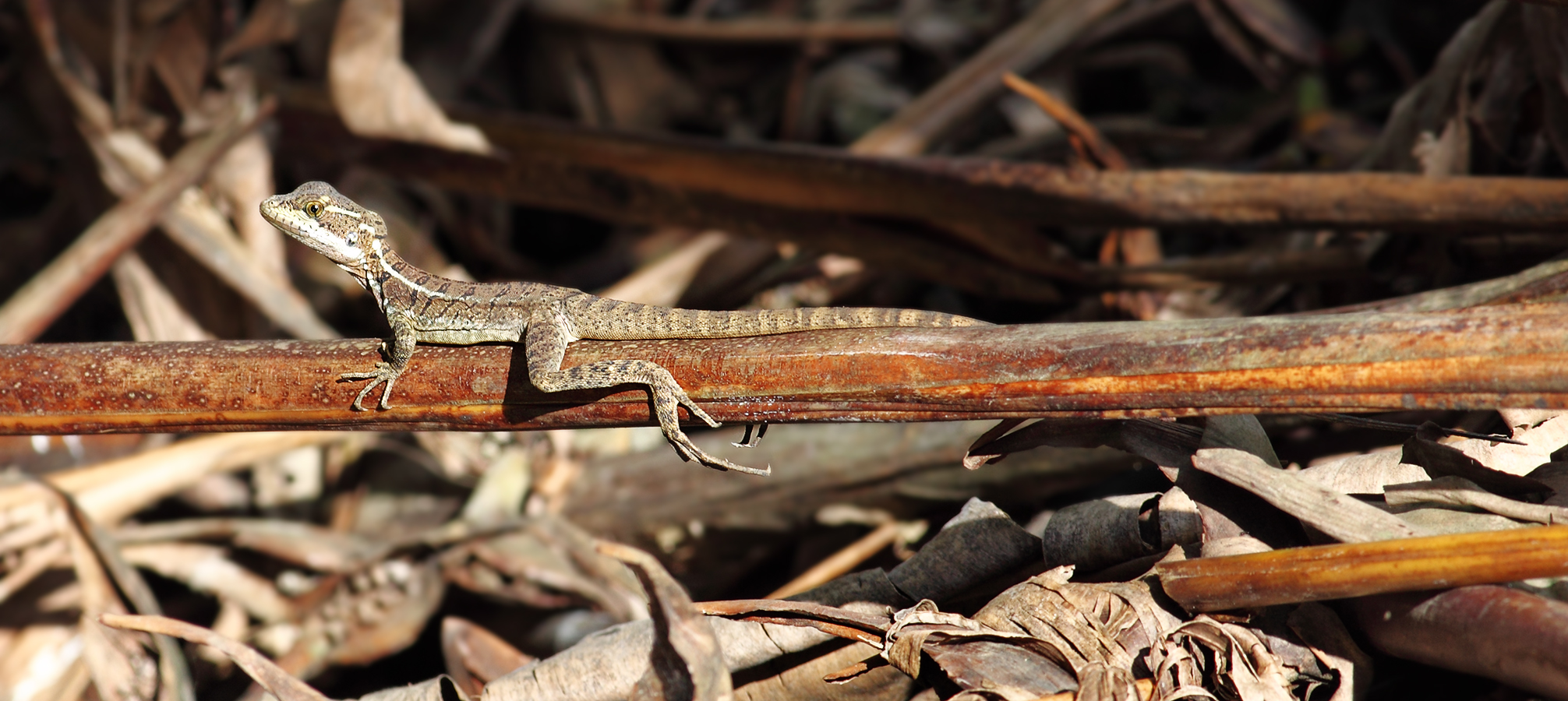
Juvenile before developing crests

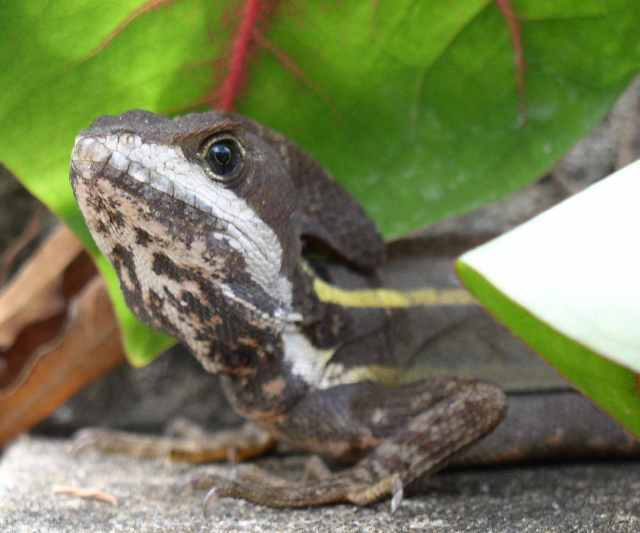
Closeup of face

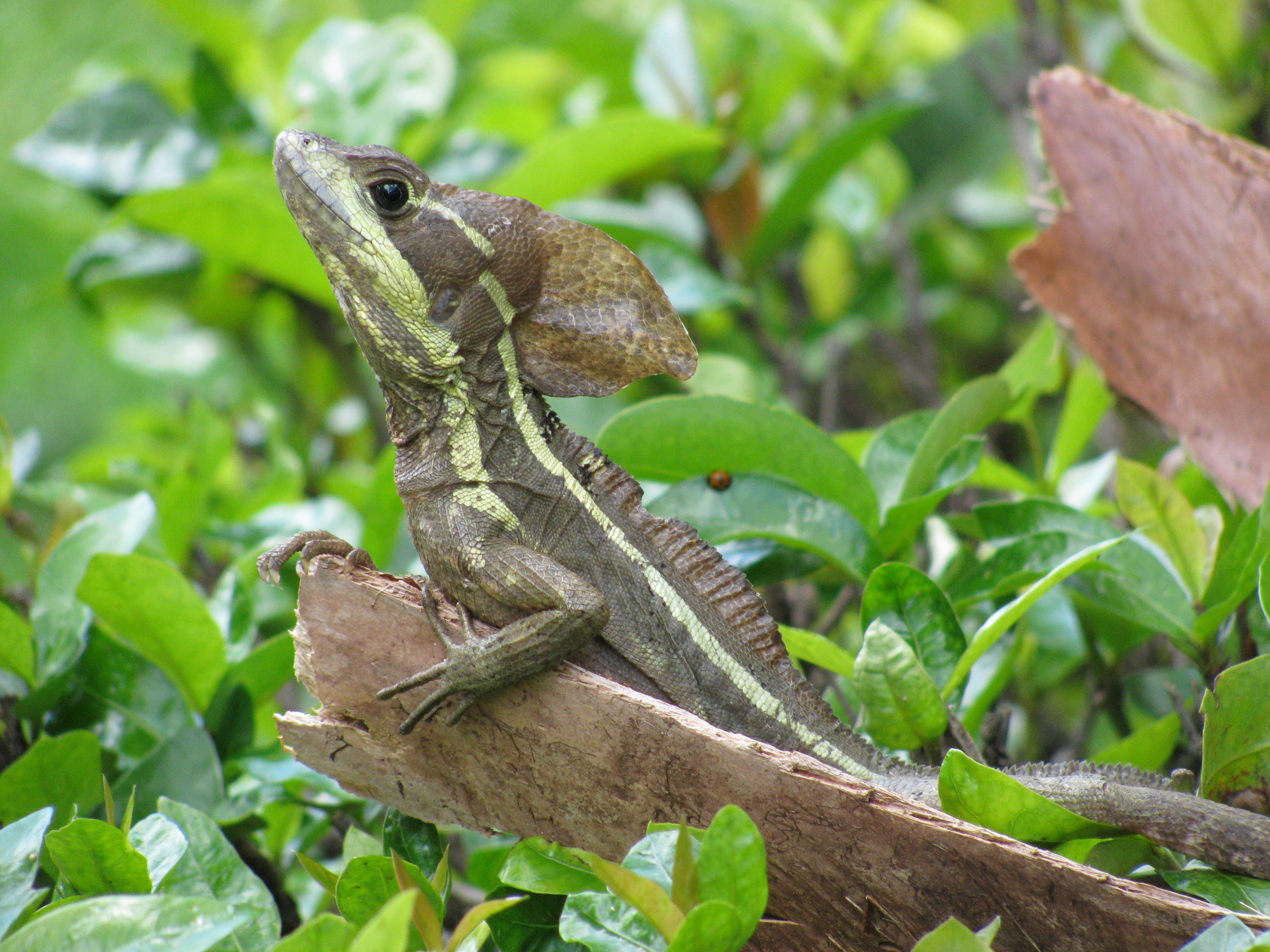
In Florida, United States

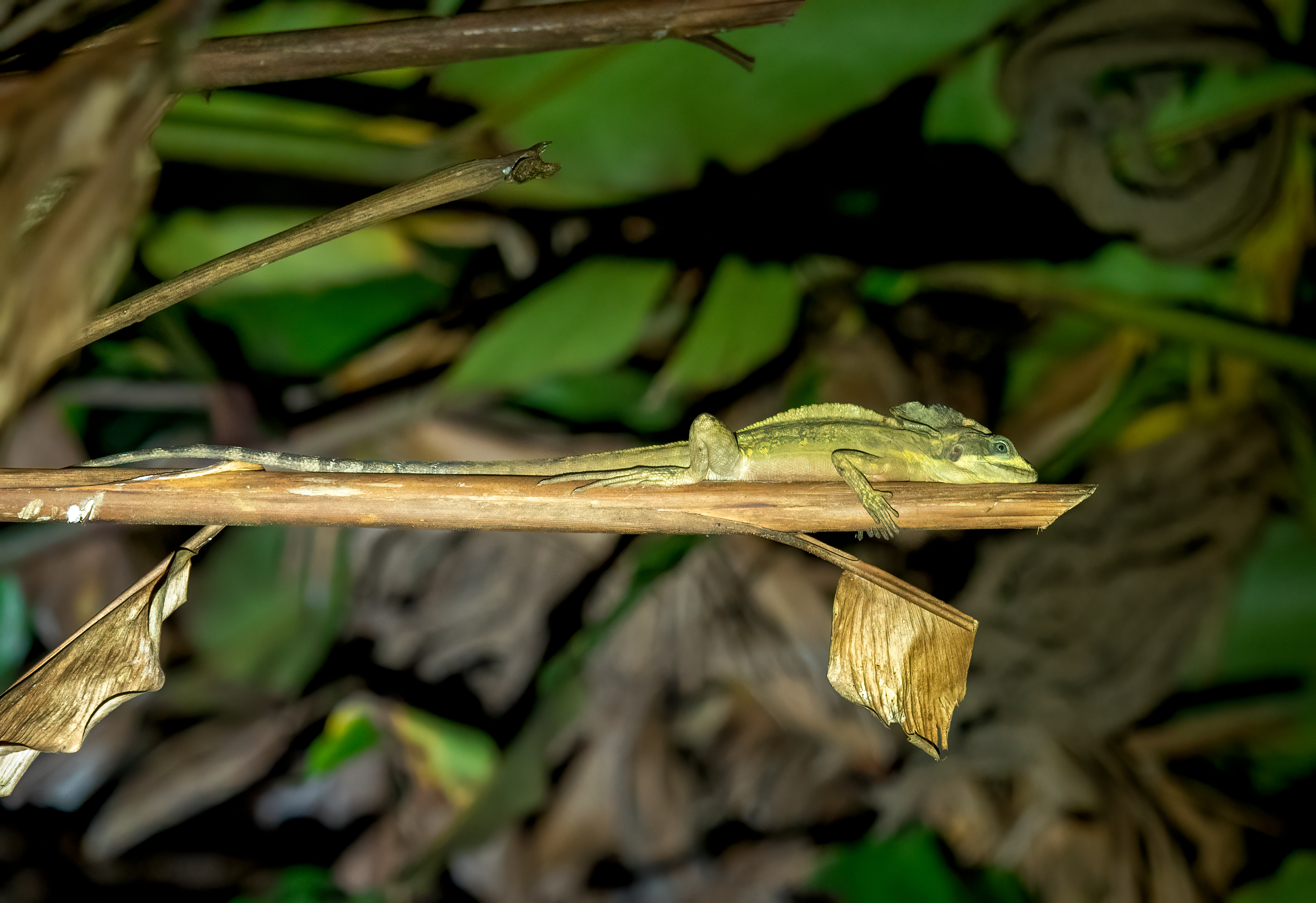
In Costa Rica at night

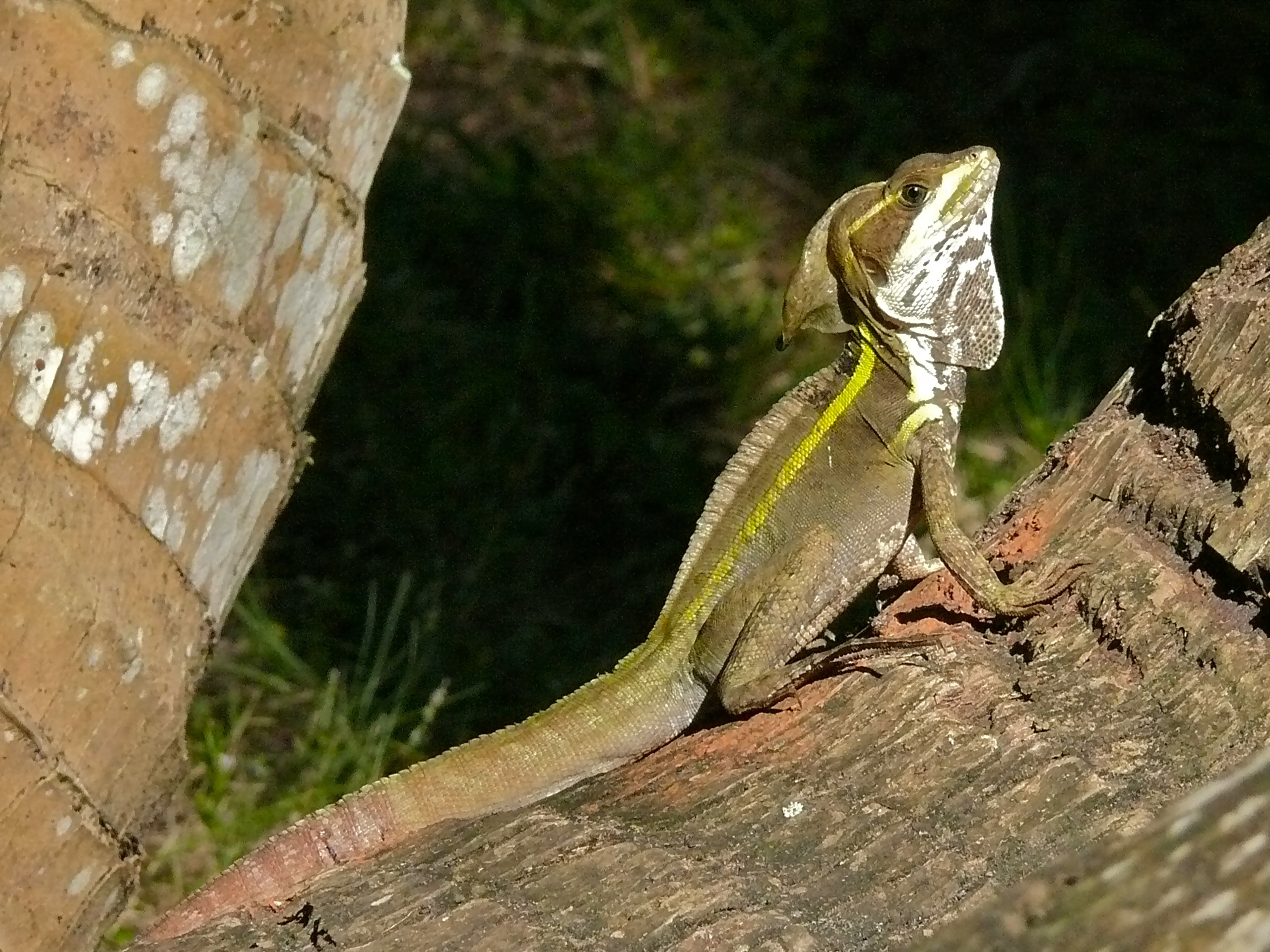
Adult Male - Costa Rica
