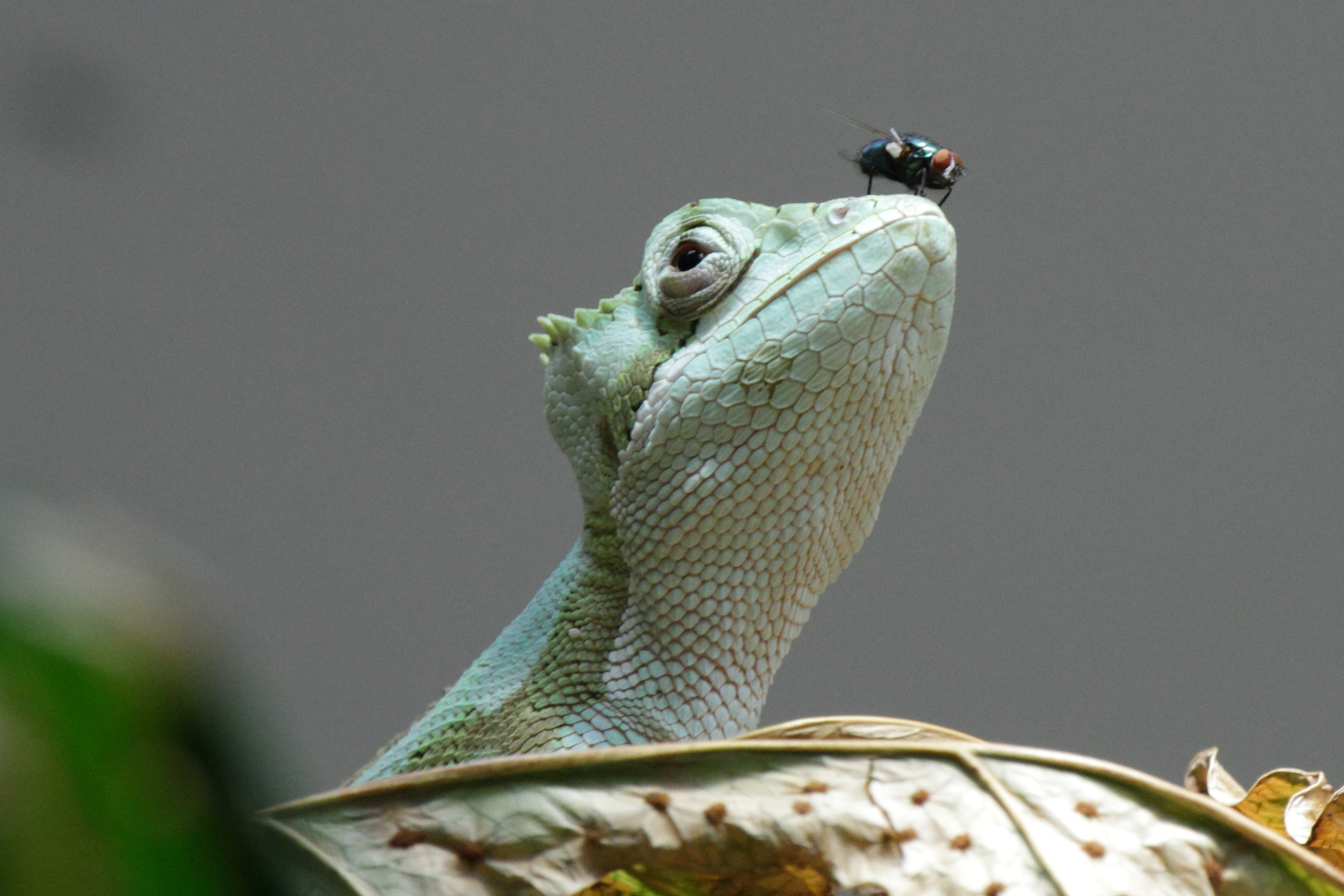

Conservation status
- Least Concern (IUCN 3.1)

Scientific classification
- Kingdom: Animalia
- Phylum: Chordata
- Class: Reptilia
- Order: Squamata
- Suborder: Iguania
- Family: Corytophanidae
- Genus: Laemanctus
- Species: L. serratus

Binomial name
- Laemanctus serratus Cope, 1864

= Laemanctus serratus =

Species of lizard

Laemanctus serratus, also known commonly as the serrated casquehead iguana, is a species of lizard in the family Corytophanidae. The species is native to southeastern Mexico and Central America. There are two recognized subspecies.

== Geographic range ==
Laemanctus serratus is found in the Mexican states of Campeche, Chiapas, Hidalgo, Oaxaca, Puebla, Querétaro, Quintana Roo, San Luis Potosí, Tamaulipas, Veracruz, and Yucatán, and also in the countries of Belize, Guatemala, and Honduras.

== Habitat ==
The preferred natural habitat of Laemanctus serratus is forest

== Description ==
Laemanctus serratus has enlarged triangular scales along the posterior margin of the head casque, and a serrated middorsal crest.

== Behavior ==
Laemanctus serratus is diurnal and arboreal.

== Reproduction ==
Laemanctus serratus is oviparous.

== Subspecies ==
Two subspecies are recognized as being valid, including the nominotypical subspecies.

- Laemanctus serratus alticoronatus Cope, 1866
- Laemanctus serratus serratus Cope, 1864
