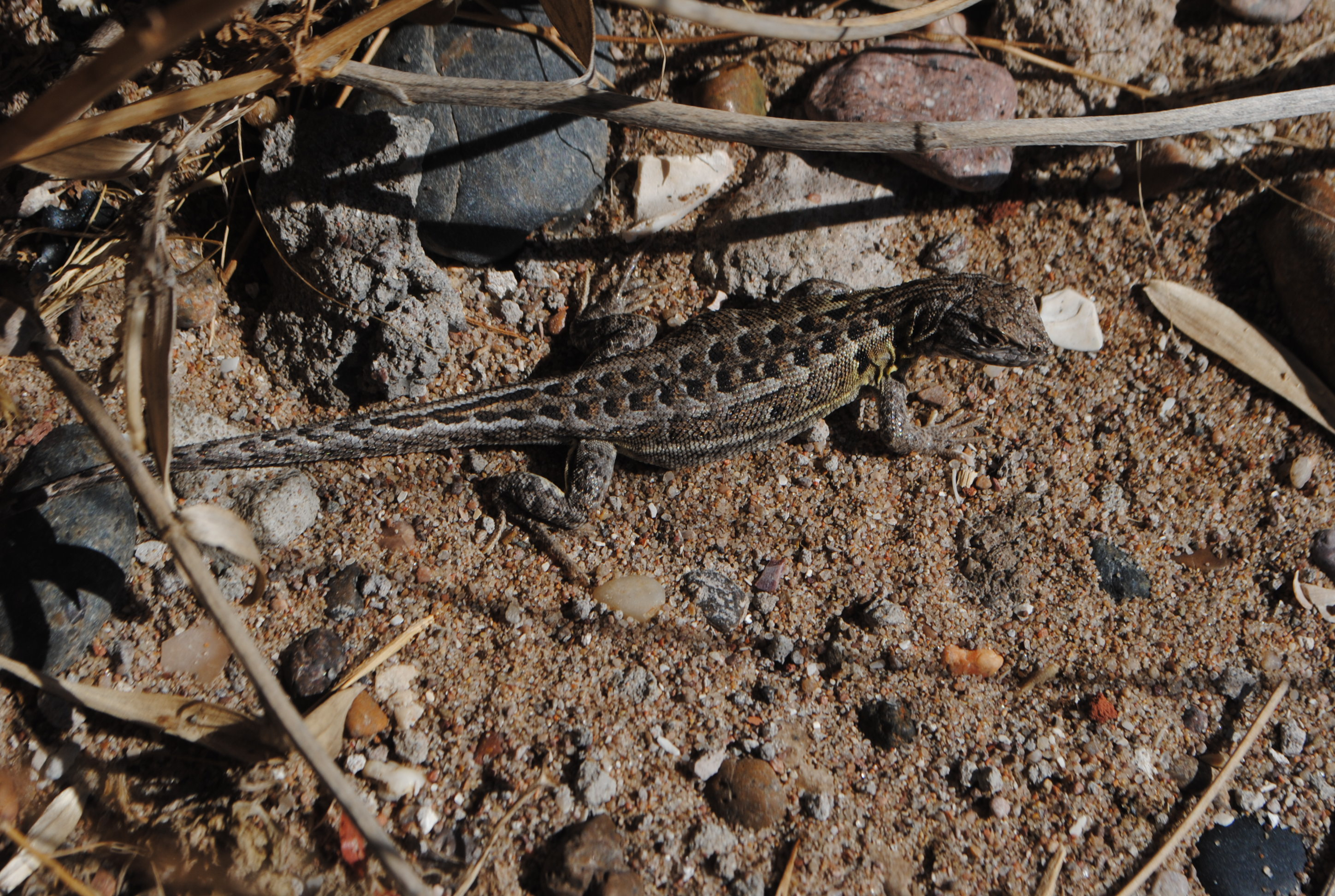

Conservation status
- Least Concern (IUCN 3.1)

Scientific classification
- Kingdom: Animalia
- Phylum: Chordata
- Class: Reptilia
- Order: Squamata
- Suborder: Iguania
- Family: Liolaemidae
- Genus: Liolaemus
- Species: L. wiegmannii

Binomial name
- Liolaemus wiegmannii (Duméril & Bibron, 1837)

= Liolaemus wiegmannii =

Species of lizard

Liolaemus wiegmannii is a species of lizard in the family Liolaemidae. It is native to Uruguay and Argentina, and was introduced to Ascension Island sometime during the 1940s.
