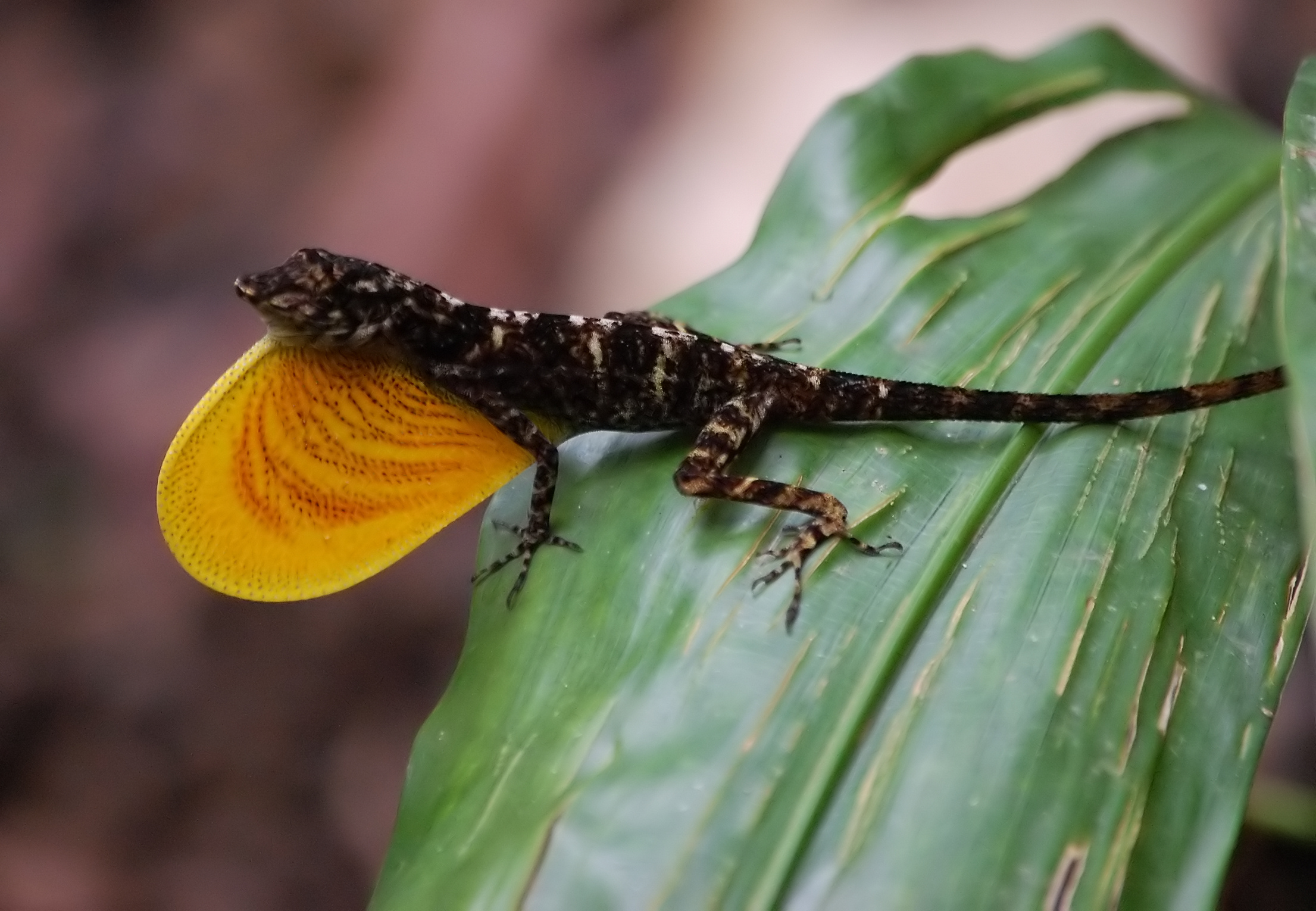
- Many-scaled anole displaying his yellow dewlap

Conservation status
- Least Concern (IUCN 3.1)

Scientific classification
- Kingdom: Animalia
- Phylum: Chordata
- Class: Reptilia
- Order: Squamata
- Suborder: Iguania
- Family: Dactyloidae
- Genus: Anolis
- Species: A. polylepis

Binomial name
- Anolis polylepis Peters, 1874

Synonyms
- Norops polylepis

= Anolis polylepis =

Many-scaled anole

Species of lizard

Anolis polylepis, the many-scaled anole or Golfo-Dulce anole, is a lizard endemic to the Gulf of Dulce area of Costa Rica.

== Description ==
A brown and white speckled lizard with an orange-yellow dewlap, made of erectile cartilage, that extends from their throat. Their toes are covered with structures that allow them to cling to many different surfaces using the van der Waals force. Their tails have the ability to break off at special segments in order to escape predators or fights. The tail itself continues to wriggle strongly for some minutes after detaching. This ability is known as autotomy. The anoles are also diurnal, which means that they are active during the daytime.

== Behavior ==
They are athletic creatures that run fast, and jump many times their length. They can also climb straight up almost any surface at blinding speed. They usually sit downward. Seeing a potential prey they dart down towards it. They display their dewlap and bob their head to attract sexual partners and to mark their territory. They feed on spiders and insects like cockroaches and mosquitoes.
