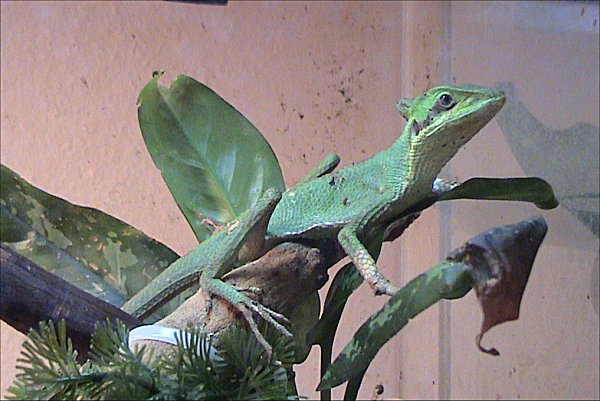
- Laemanctus longipes

Conservation status
- Least Concern (IUCN 3.1)

Scientific classification
- Kingdom: Animalia
- Phylum: Chordata
- Class: Reptilia
- Order: Squamata
- Suborder: Iguania
- Family: Corytophanidae
- Genus: Laemanctus
- Species: L. longipes

Binomial name
- Laemanctus longipes Wiegmann, 1834

= Eastern casquehead iguana =

Species of lizard

The eastern casquehead iguana (Laemanctus longipes) is a species of lizard in the family Corytophanidae. The species is native to Mexico and Central America.

== Geographic range ==
L. longipes is found in the southern Mexican states of Colima, Oaxaca, Veracruz, and Yucatán, and in the Central American countries of Belize, Guatemala, Honduras, and Nicaragua.

== Description ==
Long and thin, L. longipes can reach 70 cm (28 in) in total length, two-thirds of which is a thin tail.

The scales on the forehead are much larger than those on the back of the head. No projecting triangular scales occur on the posterior border of the head. The gular scales are bicarinate or tricarinate.

Sexual dimorphism is present, but is difficult to observe. Males have a somewhat thicker tail root than females, and the hemipenes are sometimes visible when lifting the tail gently.

=== Subspecies ===
- Laemanctus longipes deborrei Boulenger, 1877
- Laemanctus longipes longipes Wiegmann, 1834

== Habitat ==
The eastern casquehead iguana inhabits tropical wet, moist, and seasonally dry forests. It can persist in secondary growth when suitable trees are present.

== Behavior ==
The eastern casquehead iguana is an arboreal species occurring high up in the trees. Rather slow, it sits on trees and bushes above water courses, licking water drops on leaves, and catching insects that walk nearby. L. longipes lives individually, or in a territory with one male and one to three females. Usually, however, males and females only meet for mating, which can happen several times per year.

== Reproduction ==
L. longipes is oviparous.

== Subspecies ==
Two subspecies are recognized, including the nominotypical subspecies.

- L. l. deborrei Boulenger, 1877
- L. l. longipes Wiegmann, 1834

== Etymology ==
The subspecific name, deborrei, is in honor of Belgian entomologist Alfred Preudhomme de Borre (1833–1905).

== Captivity ==
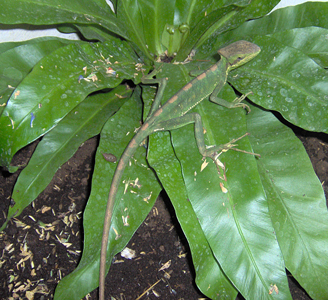
L. l. longipes

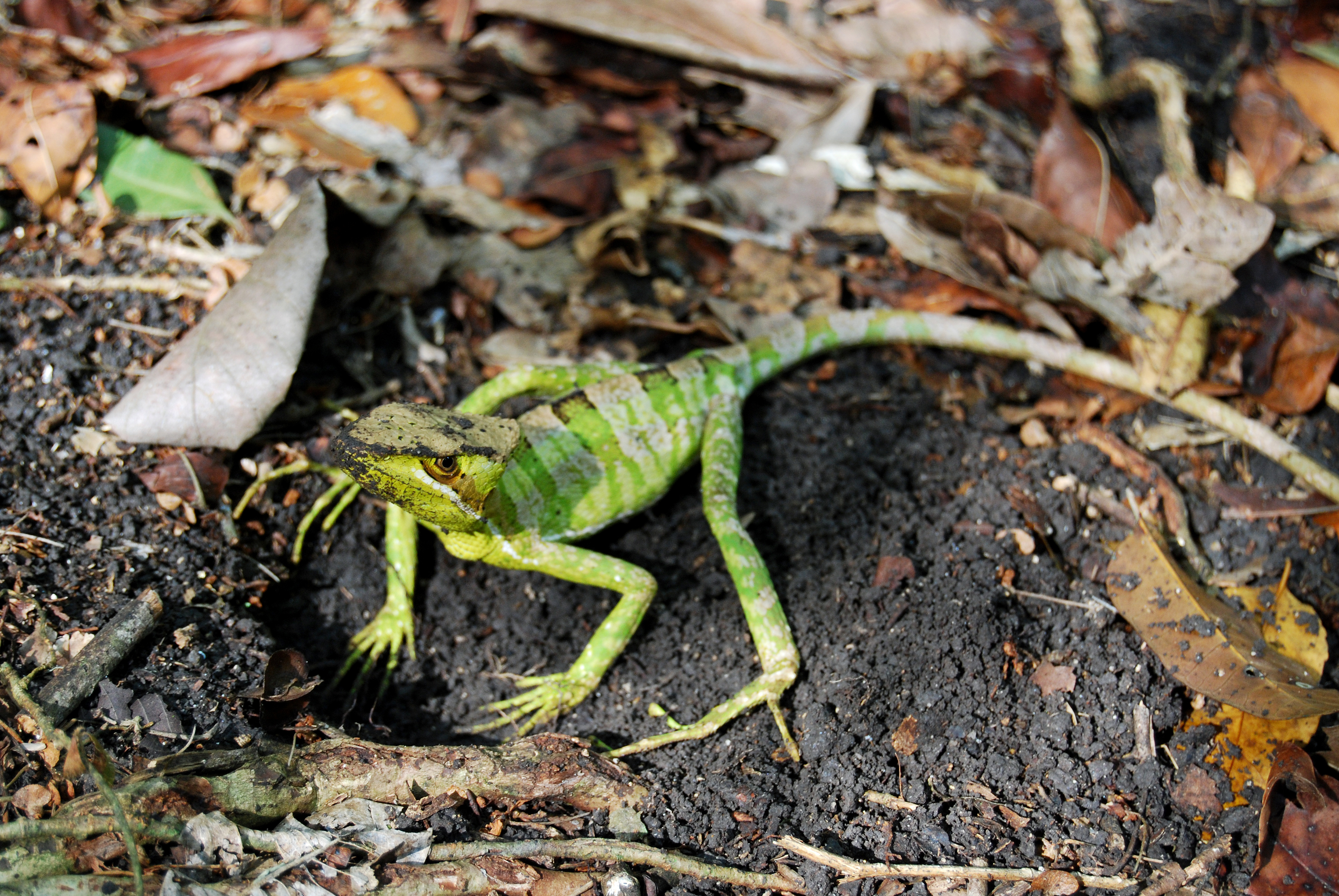
A female L. longipes digging a burrow near the Mayan ruins of El Mirador, Guatemala, possibly for use as a nesting site.

The eastern casquehead iguana is sometimes bred in captivity, but it is not a good terrarium companion for beginners, as it quickly and often dehydrates. Daily misting or a water-dropping system is essential. Temperatures should range between 25 and 35 °C (77 and 95 °F) during the day, and between 20 and 23 °C (68 and 73 °F) during the night. Humidity should range between 70 and 90%. L. longipes is a cricket eater and should receive at least four or five adult crickets every day. It also needs UVA and UVB lighting and an additional vitamin and calcium feed once a week.
