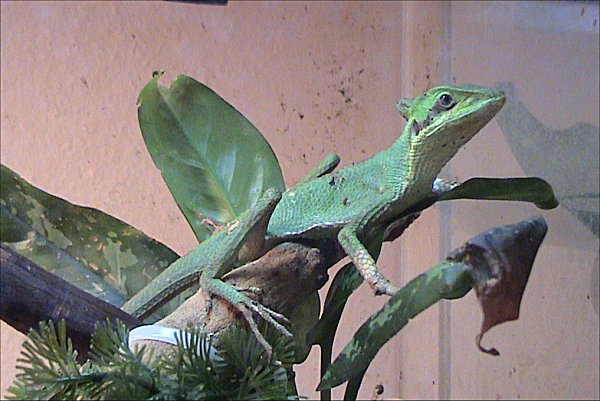
- Laemanctus longipes, eastern casquehead iguana

Scientific classification
- Kingdom: Animalia
- Phylum: Chordata
- Class: Reptilia
- Order: Squamata
- Suborder: Iguania
- Family: Corytophanidae
- Genus: Laemanctus; Wiegmann, 1834

Species
- 4, see text.

= Laemanctus =

Genus of lizards

Laemanctus is a genus of lizards in the family Corytophanidae. Species in the genus Laemanctus are commonly referred to as conehead lizards or casquehead iguanas. The genus is endemic to Central America.

== Description ==
Lizards of the genus Laemanctus exhibit the following characters. The tympanum is distinct. The plane of the top of the head slopes forward, and the occipital region is raised and extends beyond the occiput. The body is laterally compressed, and is covered with imbricate keeled scales. A strong transverse gular fold is present, but a gular pouch is absent. The limbs are very long, and the infradigital lamellae have a median tubercle-like keel. Femoral pores are absent. The tail is very long, and is round in cross section. The lateral teeth are tricuspid, and pterygoid teeth are present. The clavicle is loop-shaped proximally. A sternal fontanelle is absent. Abdominal ribs are absent.

== Species and subspecies ==
The genus Laemanctus consists of four species which are recognized as being valid. Two of these species have recognized subspecies.

Image	Scientific name	Common name	Subspecies	Distribution
	Laemanctus julioi McCranie, 2018	Julio's casquehead iguana		Honduras
	Laemanctus longipes Wiegmann, 1834	eastern casquehead iguana	Laemanctus longipes deborrei Boulenger, 1877; Laemanctus longipes longipes Wiegmann, 1834	Mexico and Central America.
	Laemanctus serratus Cope, 1864	serrated casquehead iguana	Laemanctus serratus alticoronatus Cope, 1866; Laemanctus serratus serratus Cope, 1864	southeastern Mexico and Central America.
	Laemanctus waltersi Schmidt, 1933	Walters’ casquehead iguana		Honduras.
