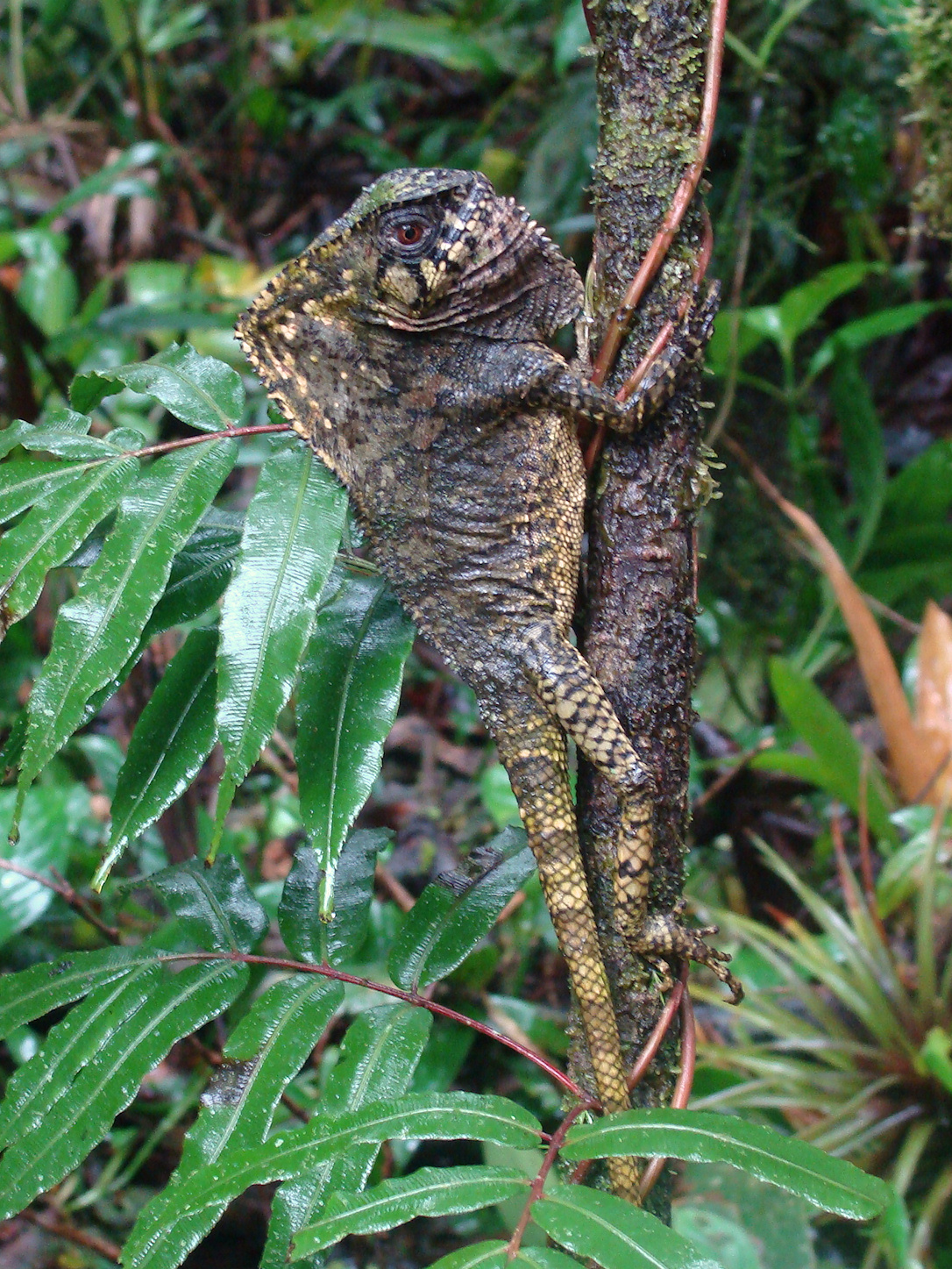

Conservation status
- Least Concern (IUCN 3.1)

Scientific classification
- Kingdom: Animalia
- Phylum: Chordata
- Order: Squamata
- Suborder: Iguania
- Family: Corytophanidae
- Genus: Corytophanes
- Species: C. cristatus

Binomial name
- Corytophanes cristatus (Merrem 1820)

Synonyms
- Agama cristata Merrem 1820; Corytophanes cristatus — A.M.C. Duméril & Bibron, 1837; Corythophanes cristatus — Ortleb & Heatwole, 1965 (ex errore); Corytophanes cristatus — Liner, 1994

= Smooth helmeted iguana =

Species of lizard

The smooth helmeted iguana (Corytophanes cristatus), also known as the helmeted iguana, the helmeted basilisk, the elegant helmeted lizard, and several other common names, is a species of Basilisk and a New World lizard in the family Corytophanidae. The species is native to southern Mexico, Central America, and northwestern South America.

== Taxonomic history ==
=== Etymology ===
The smooth helmeted iguana is named for the prominent casque, or crest on the back of its head and neck which has the appearance of a helmet.

=== Evolutionary history ===
The Corytophanidae family of lizards is thought to have Euramerican and Laurasian ancestral beginnings, and is believed to have moved down to the tropics after the Eocene period cooling, approximately 33–56 million years ago.

== Geographic range and habitat ==
C. cristatus can be found ranging from Chiapas in southern Mexico to north-western Colombia. The habitat it primarily occupies in this range is primary and secondary mesic rain-forest. It lives predominantly in trees, but also hunts on the forest floor where it uses leaf litter as a micro-habitat.

== Description ==
The smooth helmeted iguana is a medium-sized lizard with long slim legs and very long toes. It can be grey, olive, brown, black or reddish-brown with irregular blotches. The smooth helmeted iguana can change the color of its skin as a method of camouflage. As indicated by its name, the smooth helmeted iguana has a prominent crest on its head, which tapers to a saw-tooth ridge down its back. The crest is present in both males and females of the species, though the crest is larger in males. C. cristatus is approximately 9–12 cm (4–5 in) in snout-to-vent length (SVL) when mature. It is a non-heliotherm species, meaning that it does not use the sun to increase its body temperature. Rather, it maintains its body temperature at around 26 °C (79 °F), close to the temperature of the forest floor habitat where it lives. It is very wary of predators and freezes at the approach of danger from up to 15 m (49 ft) away.

== Behavior and ecology ==
=== Reproduction ===
Adult females of C. cristatus lay five to six eggs in a depression on the forest floor. It is speculated that the crest on the head may be used in excavating the nest.

=== Diet ===
C. cristatus feeds on insects, spiders, worms, and other lizards. C. cristatus is an extreme "sit and wait" predator, and its foraging is brief and infrequent. Therefore, this lizard is considered to be an opportunistic feeders. It is also a specialist feeder that preys on extremely large arthropods and cicadas when available. If it has no luck being a sit and wait predator, it will sometimes become an active predator and look for its next meal. Typically, if this is the method it chooses, it will choose prey that is slow and easy to capture.

=== Interactions with algae and fungi ===
The smooth helmeted iguana has been observed to remain motionless for extended periods of time. It is thought that this behavior has resulted in its skin being used as a novel growing substrate for a species of fungus, Physarum pusillum. This species of lizard is also the only known vertebrate observed with a cormophytic plant growing on it.

== Color change ==
The smooth helmeted iguana, like chameleons and iguanas, have the ability to change its coloration from dark to light or vice versa, which aids in thermoregulation when basking in sunlight.

== Conservation ==
The smooth helmeted iguana is common and widespread throughout its native range. There are no current conservation concerns for this species, although deforestation can be a localized threat to smooth helmeted iguana populations.
