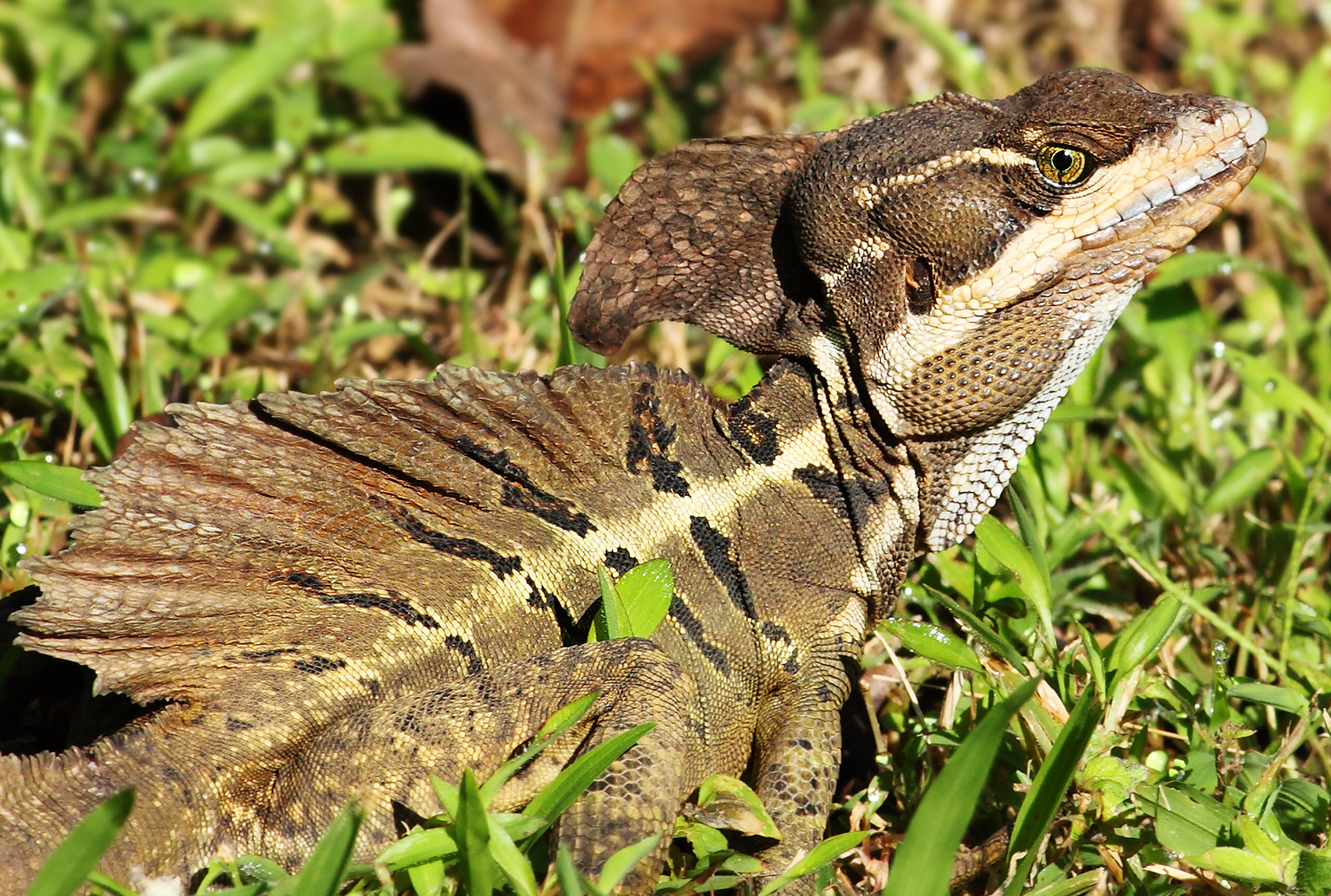
- Brown basilisk, Basiliscus vittatus, Costa Rica

Scientific classification
- Kingdom: Animalia
- Phylum: Chordata
- Class: Reptilia
- Order: Squamata
- Suborder: Iguania
- Family: Corytophanidae
- Genus: Basiliscus; Laurenti, 1768

Type species
- Draco basiliscus Linnaeus, 1758

Species
- Four, see text.

= Basiliscus (lizard) =

Basilisks

Genus of lizards

Basiliscus is a genus of large corytophanid lizards, commonly known as basilisks, which are endemic to southern Mexico, Central America, and northern South America. The genus contains four species, which are commonly known as the Jesus Christ lizard, or simply the Jesus lizard, due to their ability to run across water for significant distances, due to the large surface area of their feet, before sinking.

== Taxonomy and etymology ==
Both the generic name, Basiliscus, and the common name, "basilisk", derive from the Greek basilískos (βασιλίσκος) meaning "little king". The specific epithet, vittatus, which is Latin for "striped", was given in Carl Linnæus' 10th edition of Systema Naturæ.

== Description ==
Basilisks on average measure 70 to 75 cm (28 to 30 inches) in total length (including tail). Their growth is perpetual, fast when they are young and nonlinear for mature basilisks. Their skin is shed in pieces.

Basilisks are oviparous and lay 8–18 eggs.

== Biology ==
Basilisks can burrow into sand to hide from predators; a ring of muscles around both nostrils prevents sand from entering the nose.

=== Running on water ===
Basilisks sometimes run bipedally. Basilisks have the ability to run on water for short distances, and because of this, they have been dubbed the "Jesus Christ lizard" in reference to the biblical passage of Jesus walking on water. On water, basilisks can run at a velocity of 1.5 m (4.9 feet) per second for approximately 4.5 m (15 feet) before sinking on all fours and swimming. Flaps between their toes help support basilisks, creating a larger surface and pockets of air, giving them the ability to run across water.

Sailfin lizards and a few species of anole lizards can also run on water.

== Habitat and geographic range ==
Basilisks are abundant in the tropical rain forests of Central and South America, from southern Mexico to Ecuador and Venezuela.

== Invasive species ==
The species Basiliscus vittatus (brown basilisk) has been introduced to Florida. It has adapted to the colder winters by burrowing into leaf litter for warmth. Current reports sight the brown basilisk as far north as Fort Pierce, on the state's East Coast, where small groups have crept up the North Fork of the Saint Lucie River. Mainly it has been seen in Boca Raton and other cities in Palm Beach County.

== Classification ==
Genus Basiliscus has four extant species:

Image	Scientific name	Common name	Distribution
	Basiliscus basiliscus (Linnaeus, 1758)	common basilisk	from southwestern Nicaragua to northwestern Colombia on the Pacific side, and from central Panama to northwestern Venezuela
	Basiliscus galeritus A.M.C. Duméril & A.H.A. Duméril, 1851	western basilisk, red-headed basilisk	western Colombia and western Ecuador
	Basiliscus plumifrons Cope, 1875	plumed basilisk, green basilisk, double crested basilisk	eastern Honduras, through Nicaragua and Costa Rica, to western Panama
	Basiliscus vittatus Wiegmann, 1828	brown basilisk, striped basilisk	Mexico, Central America and adjacent northwestern Colombia
