= Corytophanidae =

Corytophanidae Temporal range: Early Eocene - present, 48–0 Ma
- Skulls of representative species of all corytophanid genera

Scientific classification
- Kingdom: Animalia
- Phylum: Chordata
- Class: Reptilia
- Order: Squamata
- Suborder: Iguania
- Infraorder: Pleurodonta
- Family: Corytophanidae; Fitzinger, 1843

Genera
- †Babibasiliscus Conrad, 2015; Basiliscus Laurenti, 1768; Corytophanes H. Boie, 1826; †Geiseltaliellus Kuhn, 1944; Laemanctus Wiegmann, 1834

Synonyms
- Corythophanae Fitzinger, 1843; Basiliscidae

Family of lizards

Corytophanidae is a family of iguanian lizards, also called casquehead lizards or helmeted lizards, endemic to the New World. Nine species of casquehead lizards from three genera are recognized.

== Geographic range ==
Corytophanids are found from Mexico, through Central America, and as far south as Ecuador.

Certain species are now extant in South Florida and are considered invasive.

== Description ==
The casquehead lizards are moderately sized lizards, with laterally compressed bodies, and typically have well-developed head crests in the shape of a casque helmet. This crest is a sexually dimorphic characteristic in males of Basiliscus, but is present in both sexes of Corytophanes and Laemanctus. In past years there has been evidence of corytophanids in the Eocene of North America. The greatest percentage of omnivorous species (> 10% plant diet), over 30% in each, and the highest mean percentage of plant matter in the diet are corytophanids.

== Behavior ==
In Corytophanes, the head crests are used in defensive displays, where the lateral aspect of the body is brought about to face a potential predator in an effort to look bigger. Unlike many of their close relatives, they are unable to break off their tails when captured, probably because the tail is essential as a counterbalance during rapid movement.

== Habitat ==
Casquehead lizards are forest-dwelling. All corytophanids are excellent climbers, and they are usually found in trees or low bushes.

== Reproduction ==
Despite the small number of species in the family Corytophanidae, it includes both egg-laying species and species that give birth to live young.

== Genera and species ==
Family Corytophanidae

Image	Genus	Living species
	Basiliscus Laurenti, 1768	Basiliscus basiliscus — Common basilisk (Linnaeus, 1758); Basiliscus galeritus — Western basilisk A.M.C. Duméril & A.H.A. Duméril, 1851; Basiliscus plumifrons — Plumed basilisk Cope, 1875; Basiliscus vittatus — Brown basilisk Wiegmann, 1828
	Corytophanes H. Boie in Schlegel, 1826	Corytophanes cristatus — Helmeted iguana (Merrem, 1820); Corytophanes hernandesii — Hernandez's helmeted basilisk (Wiegmann, 1831); Corytophanes percarinatus — Guatemalan helmeted basilisk A.H.A. Duméril, 1856
	Laemanctus Wiegmann, 1834	Laemanctus julioi — Julio's casquehead iguana McCranie, 2018; Laemanctus longipes — Eastern casquehead iguana Wiegmann, 1834; Laemanctus serratus — Serrated casquehead iguana Cope, 1864; Laemanctus waltersi — Walter's casquehead iguana Schmidt, 1933

Nota bene: In the following lists, a binomial authority in parentheses indicates that the species was originally described in a different genus.
