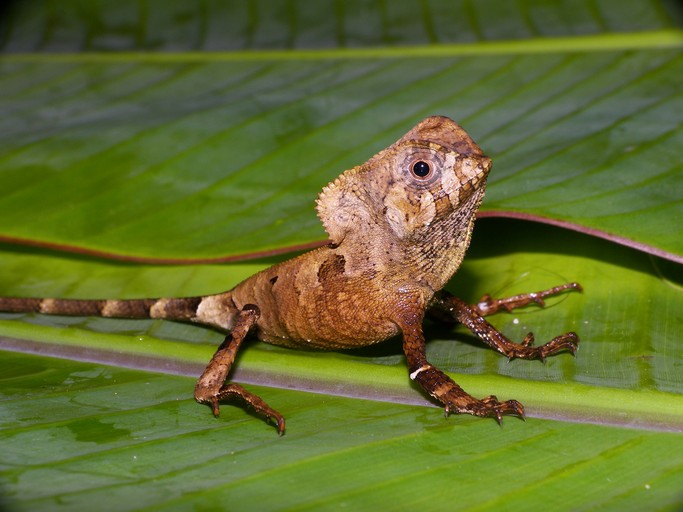
- Corytophanes cristatus

Scientific classification
- Kingdom: Animalia
- Phylum: Chordata
- Class: Reptilia
- Order: Squamata
- Suborder: Iguania
- Family: Corytophanidae
- Genus: Corytophanes; H. Boie in Schlegel, 1826

Species
- Three, see text.

Synonyms
- Chamæleopsis, Corythophanes

= Corytophanes =

Genus of lizards

Corytophanes is a genus of Neotropical lizards, commonly called helmeted iguanas or basilisks, in the family Corytophanidae. The genus contains three arboreal species and resides in tropical forests.

== Species ==
These species are recognized as being valid:

Image	Scientific name	Common name	Distribution
	Corytophanes cristatus (Merrem, 1820)	helmeted iguana	Chiapas in southern Mexico to north-western Colombia
	Corytophanes hernandesii (Wiegmann, 1831)	Hernandez's helmeted basilisk	Mexico, Belize, Guatemala, and Honduras.
	Corytophanes percarinatus A.H.A. Duméril, 1856	Guatemalan helmeted basilisk	El Salvador, Guatemala, Honduras, and southern Mexico (Chiapas).

Nota bene: A binomial authority in parentheses indicates that the species was originally described in a genus other than Corytophanes.

== Etymology ==
The specific name, hernandesii, is in honor of Spanish naturalist Francisco Hernández (1514-1587).
