= Arend Friedrich August Wiegmann =

German zoologist and herpetologist

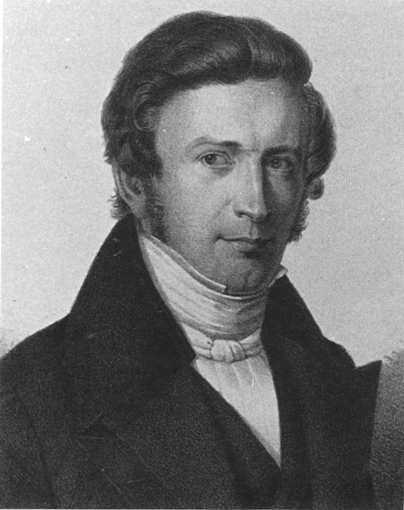
Arend Friedrich August Wiegmann

Arend Friedrich August Wiegmann (2 June 1802 – 15 January 1841) was a German zoologist and herpetologist born in Braunschweig.

He studied medicine and philology at the University of Leipzig, and afterwards was an assistant to Martin Lichtenstein (1780–1857) in Berlin. In 1828 he became a professor at University of Cologne, and two years later was an extraordinary professor at the Friedrich Wilhelm University in Berlin.

Wiegmann specialized in the study of herpetology and mammalogy. In 1835, he founded, together with other scholars, the zoological periodical Archiv für Naturgeschichte, also known as "Wiegmann's Archive". With Johann Friedrich Ruthe (1788–1859) he wrote an important textbook of zoology called Handbuch der Zoologie, and in 1834 Wiegmann published Herpetologia Mexicana, a monograph on the reptiles of Mexico.

In 1841 he died of tuberculosis at the age of 38 in Berlin.

His father Arend Friedrich Wiegmann (1771–1853) was a German researcher in botany.

== Species described by Wiegmann ==
Of the many species of reptiles which he described, 55 species are still considered valid, among which are:

- Gerrhonotus liocephalus in 1828
- Heloderma horridum, the venomous Mexican beaded lizard, in 1829
- Pelodiscus sinensis in 1834
- Laemanctus longipes also in 1834
- Scincus hemprichii in 1837

He also described several new species of amphibians.

== Species named in honor of Wiegmann ==
Wiegmann is commemorated in the scientific names of three species of Reptiles:

- Liolaemus wiegmannii (A.M.C. Duméril & Bibron, 1837)
- Otocryptis wiegmanni Wagler, 1830
- Trogonophis wiegmanni Kaup, 1830
