= History of Valencia =

History of the city Valencia in Spain

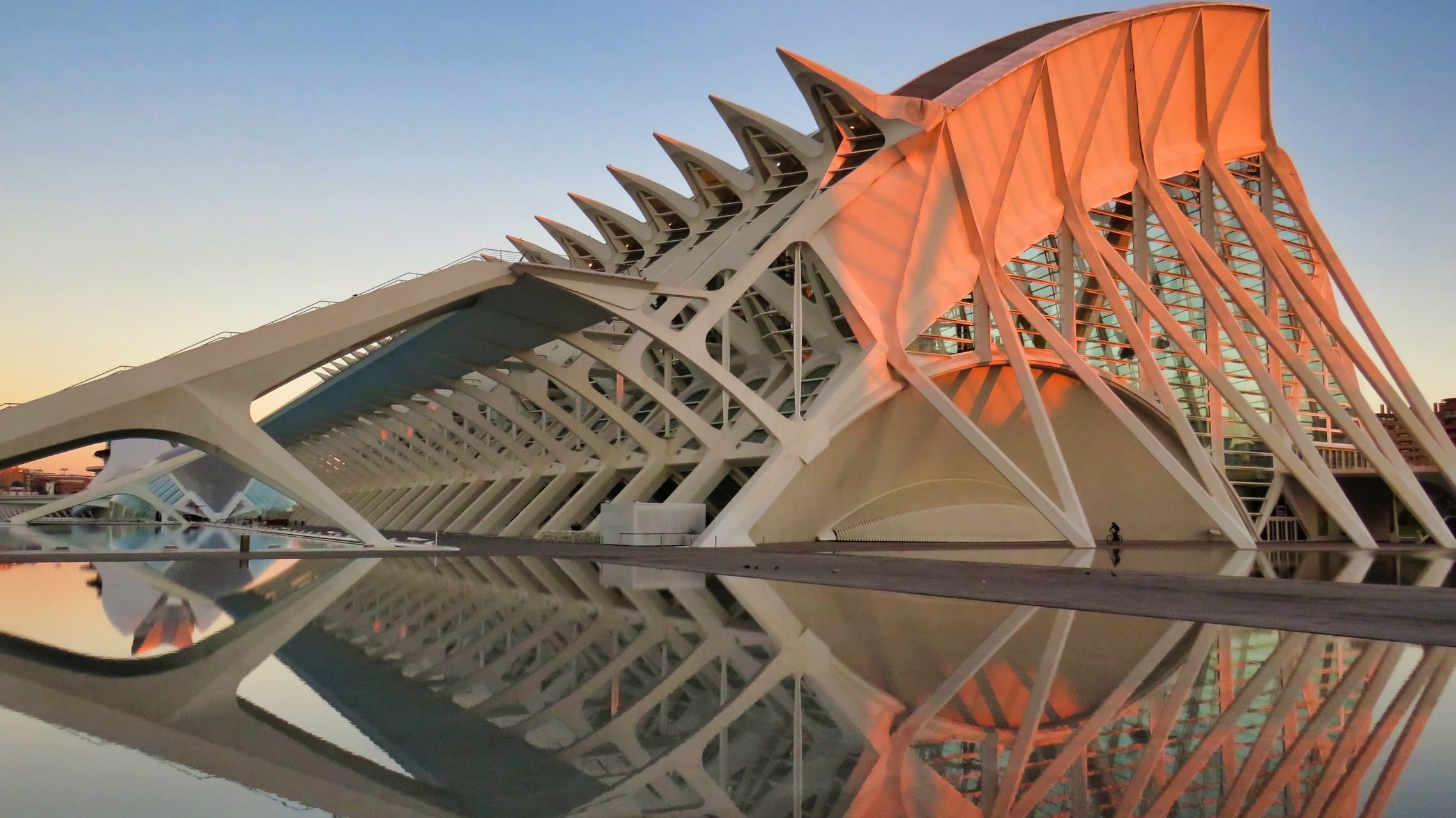
Museu de les Ciències in Valencia, designed by architect Santiago Calatrava

The history of Valencia, one of the oldest cities in Spain, begins over 2100 years ago with its founding as a Roman colony under the name "Valentia Edetanorum" on the site of a former Iberian town, by the river Turia in the province of Edetania. The Roman consul Decimus Junius Brutus Callaicus transferred about 2,000 veteran soldiers who had fought under him to Valentia in 138 BC. Valentia lay in a strategic location near the sea on a river island that would later be crossed by the Via Augusta. Pompey razed Valentia to the ground in 75 BC; it was rebuilt about fifty years later with large infrastructure projects, and by the mid-1st century, was experiencing rapid urban growth with many colonists from Italy.

With the arrival of the first waves of invading Germanic peoples and the power vacuum left by the demise of the Roman imperial administration in Hispania, the church assumed the reins of power in the city. In 625, Visigothic military contingents were posted there. During Visigothic times Valencia was an episcopal see of the Catholic Church. The city surrendered without resistance to the invading Muslim Berbers and Arabs in 714 AD. and Islamic culture was established. Valencia, then called Balansiyya, prospered from the 10th century as a trading centre. In 1092, the Castilian nobleman El Cid, in command of a combined Christian and Muslim army, besieged the fortified city of Valencia. On 17 June 1094, the city surrendered and El Cid entered with his army. He ruled for five years until he died defending the city during a siege by the Almoravids. The city remained in Christian hands until 1102, when the Almoravids retook it. In 1238, James I of Aragon laid siege to Valencia and forced its surrender.

The city was devastated by the Black Death in 1348 and by the series of wars and riots that followed. The 15th century was a time of economic expansion, allowing culture and the arts to flourish in what became known as the Valencian Golden Age. The first printing press in the Iberian Peninsula was located in Valencia, and it became one of the most influential cities on the Mediterranean in the 15th and 16th centuries. Following the discovery of the Americas, the Valencians, like the Catalans and the Aragonese, were prohibited from participating in the cross-Atlantic commerce, which was controlled by Castile. This caused a severe economic crisis in the city, which was made worse with the expulsion in 1609 of the Jews and the Moriscos. The city declined even further when the War of Spanish Succession (1701–1714) led to the end of the political and legal independence of the Kingdom of Valencia. The ancient Charters of Valencia were abolished and the city was governed by the Castilian Charter.

The Valencian economy recovered during the 18th century with the rising manufacture of woven silk and ceramic tiles. The humanistic ideals of the Enlightenment in 18th century Europe had their effect on the social, economical, and cultural institutions of the city. The Peninsular War began in Spain when Napoleon's armies invaded the Iberian Peninsula; when they reached Valencia, the Valencian people rose in arms against them on 23 May 1808. After a long siege, the French took the city on 8 January 1812. It became the capital of Spain when Joseph Bonaparte, Napoleon's elder brother and pretender to the Spanish throne, moved the royal court there in the middle of 1812. The French were defeated at the Battle of Vitoria in June 1813, and withdrew in July.

Ferdinand VII became king after the Spanish victory in the war freed Spain from Napoleonic domination. When he returned from exile in France in 1814, the Cortes of Cádiz requested that he respect the liberal Constitution of 1812, which limited royal powers. Ferdinand refused and went to Valencia instead of Madrid. There, he abolished the constitution and dissolved the Spanish Parliament, beginning six years (1814–1820) of absolutist rule. The constitution was reinstated during the Trienio Liberal, a period of three years of liberal government in Spain from 1820–1823. Conflict between absolutists and liberals continued, and in the period of conservative rule called the Ominous Decade (1823–1833) which followed there was ruthless repression by government forces and the Catholic Inquisition.

During his second term as Prime Minister of Spain, Baldomero Espartero declared that all the estates belonging to the Church, its congregations, and its religious orders were national property – in Valencia, most of this property was subsequently acquired by the local bourgeoisie. City life in Valencia carried on in a revolutionary climate, with frequent clashes between liberals and republicans, and the constant threat of reprisals by the Carlist troops of General Cabrera. The reign of Isabella II (1843–1868) was a period of relative stability and growth for Valencia. Services and infrastructure were substantially improved, while a large-scale construction project was initiated at the port. Gas lighting was introduced in 1840, and a public works project was initiated to pave the streets. The public water supply network was completed in 1850, and electricity was introduced in 1882. During the second half of the 19th century the bourgeoisie encouraged the development of the city and its environs; land-owners were enriched by the introduction of the orange crop and the expansion of vineyards and other crops. This economic boom corresponded with a revival of local traditions and of the Valencian language. Around 1870, the Valencian Renaissance, a movement committed to the revival of the Valencian language and traditions, began to gain ascendancy.

During the 20th century Valencia remained the third most populous city of Spain as its population tripled; Valencia was also third in industrial and economic development. There was urban expansion of the city in the latter 1800s, and construction of the Gare du Nord railway station was completed in 1921. By the early 20th century Valencia was an industrialised city. Small businesses predominated, but with the rapid mechanisation of industry larger companies were being formed. Industrial workers began to organise in increasing numbers to demand better living conditions. The Republican party of Blasco Ibáñez responded to these demands and gained enormous popular support.

World War I greatly affected the Valencian economy, causing the collapse of its citrus exports. The establishment of the dictatorship of Primo de Rivera in 1923 tempered social unrest for some years, but not the growing political radicalisation of the working classes. The labor movement gradually consolidated its union organisation, while the conservative factions rallied around the Valencian Regional Right. The Second Spanish Republic (1931–1939) opened the way for democratic participation and the increased politicisation of citizens, especially in response to the rise of Conservative Front power in 1933. The elections of 1936 were won by the Popular Front political coalition, which promoted the interests of the masses. On 6 November 1936, Valencia became the capital of Republican Spain under the control of Prime Minister Manuel Azaña. The city was heavily bombarded by air and sea during the Spanish Civil War, inflicting massive destruction on several occasions; by the end of the war the city had survived 442 bombardments. Valencia surrendered on 30 March 1939, and Nationalist troops entered the city.

The postwar years were a time of hardship for Valencians. Under Francisco Franco's dictatorship, speaking and teaching the Valencian language were prohibited; learning it is now compulsory for every schoolchild in Valencia. The economy began to recover in the early 1960s, and the city experienced explosive population growth through immigration. With the advent of democracy in Spain, the ancient kingdom of Valencia was established as a new autonomous entity, the Valencian Community, the Statute of Autonomy of 1982 designating Valencia as its capital. Valencia has since then experienced a surge in its cultural development, exemplified by exhibitions and performances at its cultural institutions. Public works and the rehabilitation of the Old City (Ciutat Vella) have helped improve the city's livability and tourism has continually increased. In 2007 Valencia hosted the America's Cup yacht race, and again in 2010.

== Roman Valentia ==
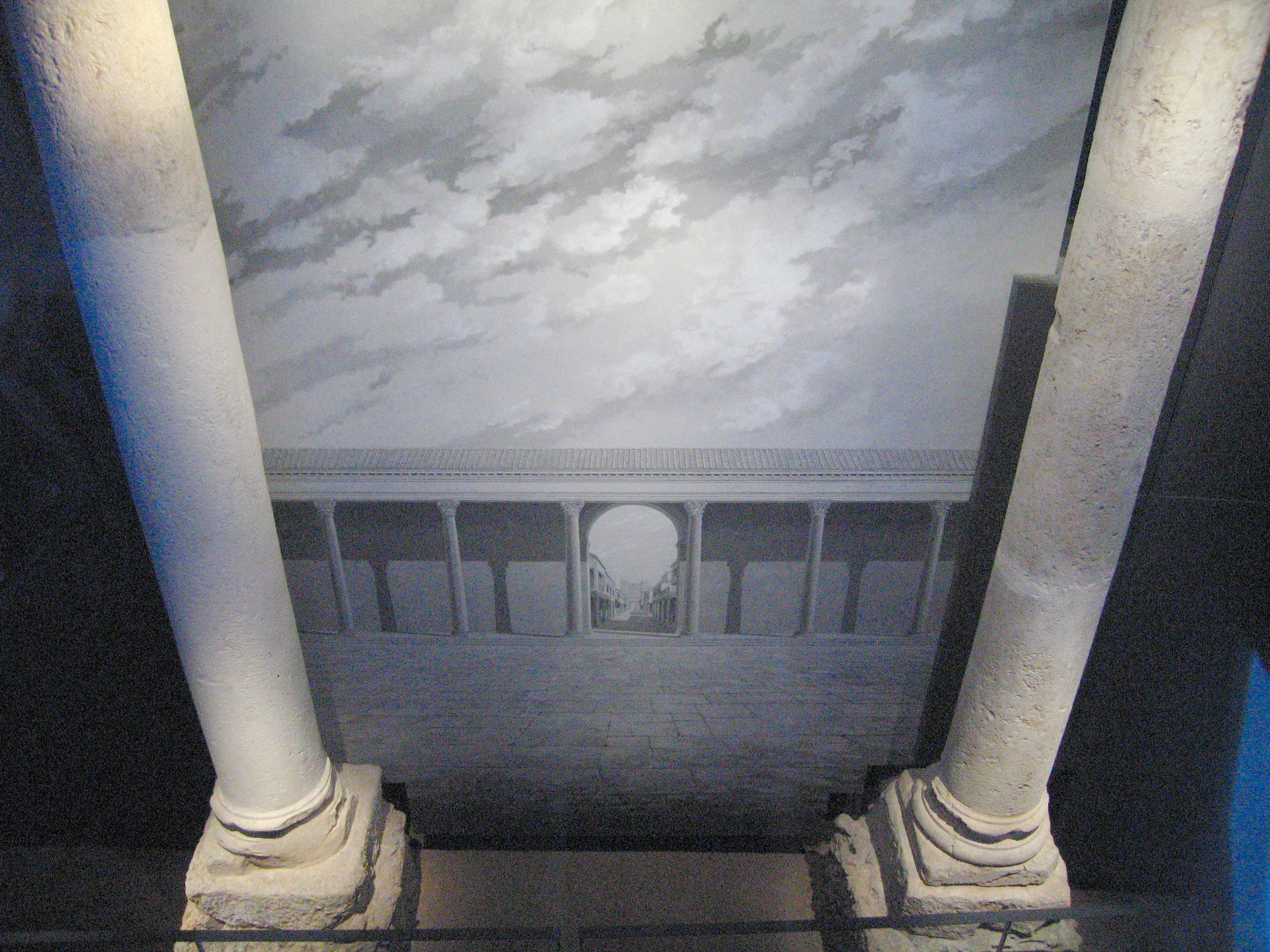
Remains of the Roman city were found in the Plaza de Décimo Junio Bruto. The Museo de L'Almoina was built on these ruins.

About two thousand Roman colonists were settled in Valentia in 138 BC during the rule of consul Decimus Junius Brutus Callaicus, making it among the oldest Roman cities outside of Italy. The Roman Historian Livy said, "In Hispania, consul Junius Brutus gave land and a town, called Valentia, to those who had fought under Virtiathus." Some years later the Roman historian Florus said that Brutus transferred the soldiers who had fought under him to that province. Valentia developed as a typical Roman city from its inception, as it lay in a strategic location near the sea on a river island that would be crossed by the Via Augusta, the imperial road connecting the province to Rome, the capital of the empire. The site had been occupied since at least the end of the 4th century BC by a native Iberian people, the Edetani. The centre of the Roman city was located in the present-day neighbourhood of the Plaza de la Virgen. Here was the forum and the crossing of the Cardo Maximus and the Decumanus Maximus, which remain the two main axes of the city in modern times. The Cardo corresponds to the existing Calle de Salvador, Almoina, and the Decumanus corresponds to Calle de los Caballeros.

Pompey razed Valentia to the ground in 75 BC to punish it for its loyalty to Sertorius. It was rebuilt about fifty years later with large infrastructure projects, and by the mid-1st century, was experiencing rapid urban growth with the arrival of many colonists from Italy. Pomponius Mela called it one of the principal cities of the Tarraconensis province. Valentia suffered a new period of decline in the 3rd century, but an early Christian community arose there during the latter years of the Roman Empire, in the 4th century.

== Middle Ages ==
=== Visigothic Period ===
A few centuries later, coinciding with the first waves of the invading Germanic peoples (Suevi, Vandals and Alans, and later the Visigoths) and the power vacuum left by the demise of the Roman imperial administration, the church assumed the reins of power in the city and replaced the old Roman temples with Christian religious buildings. With the Byzantine invasion of the southwestern Iberian peninsula in 554, the city acquired strategic importance. After the expulsion of the Byzantines in 625, Visigothic military contingents were posted there and the ancient Roman amphitheatre was fortified. Little is known of its history for nearly a hundred years; although this period is only scarcely documented by archeology, excavations suggest that there was little development of the city. During Visigothic times Valencia was an episcopal See of the Catholic Church, albeit a suffragan diocese subordinate to the archdiocese of Toledo, comprising the ancient Roman province of Carthaginensis in Hispania.

=== Muslim Balansiya ===
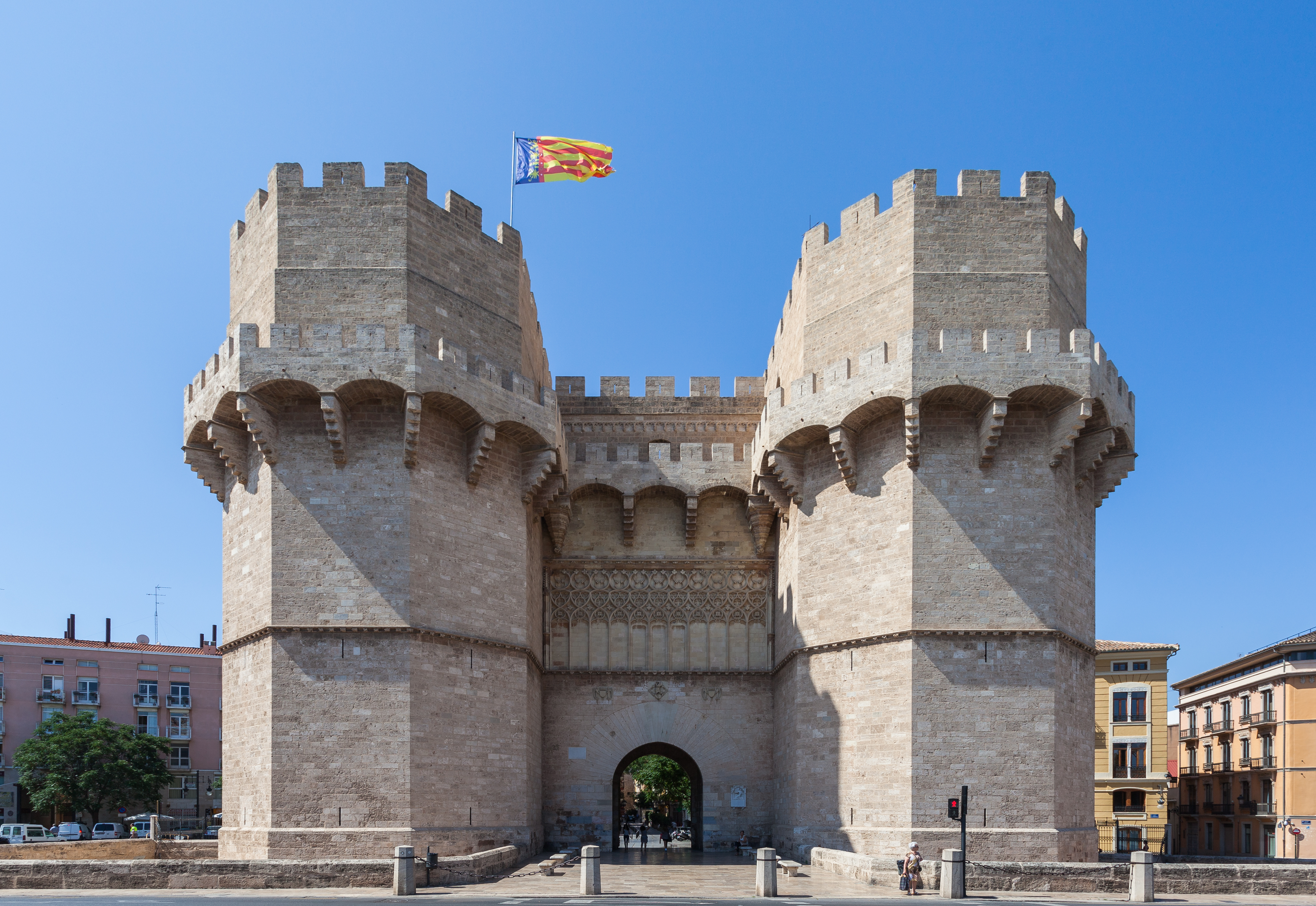
Towers of Serranos, it is one of the twelve gates that was guarding the Christian city walls of Valencia. Of Valencian Gothic, built between 1392 and 1398. This gate was then used by kings to enter the city.

The city had surrendered without a fight to the invading Moors (Berbers and Arabs) by 714 AD, and the cathedral of Saint Vincent was turned into a mosque. Abd al-Rahman I, the first emir of Cordoba, ordered the city destroyed in 755 during his wars against the other nobility, but several years later his son, Abd Allah, had a form of autonomous rule over the province of Valencia. Among his administrative acts he ordered the building of a luxurious palace, the Russafa, on the outskirts of the city in the neighbourhood of the same name, now Ruzafa. So far no remains have been found. Also at this time Valencia received the name Madinat al-Turab (City of Earth). When Islamic culture settled in, Valencia, then called Balansiyya, prospered from the 10th century, due to a booming trade in paper, silk, leather, ceramics, glass and silver-work. The architectural legacy of this period is abundant in Valencia and can still be appreciated today in the remnants of the old walls, the Baños del Almirante bath house, Portal de Valldigna street and even the Cathedral and the tower, El Micalet (El Miguelete) (built between 1381 and 1429), which was the minaret of the old mosque.

After the death of Almanzor and the unrest that followed, Muslim Al-Andalus disintegrated into numerous small states known as taifas, one of which was the Taifa of Valencia, which existed for four distinct periods: 1010–1065, 1075–1094, 1145–1147, and 1229–1238.

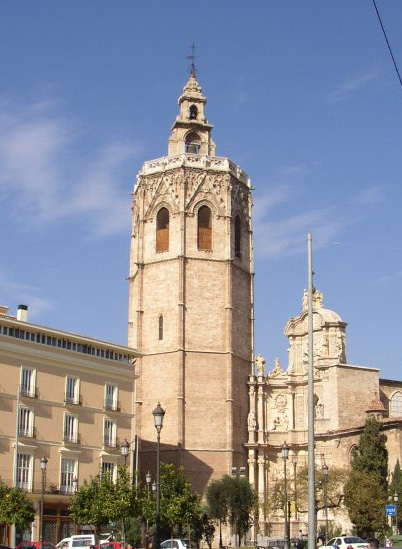
El Micalet or El Miguelete is the belfry of the cathedral, of Valencian Gothic style.

Balansiyya had a rebirth of sorts with the beginning of the Taifa of Valencia kingdom in the 11th century. The town grew, and during the reign of Abd al-Aziz al-Mansūr a new city wall was built, remains of which are preserved throughout the Old City (Ciutat Vella) today. The Castilian nobleman Rodrigo Diaz de Vivar, known as El Cid, who was intent on possessing his own principality on the Mediterranean, entered the province in command of a combined Christian and Moorish army and besieged the city beginning in 1092. By the time the siege ended in May 1094, he had carved out his own fiefdom—which he ruled from 15 June 1094 to July 1099. This victory was immortalised in the Lay of the Cid. During his rule, he converted nine mosques into churches and installed the French monk Jérôme as bishop of the See of Valencia. El Cid died in July 1099 while defending the city from an Almoravid siege, whereupon his wife Ximena Díaz ruled in his place for two years.

The city remained in the hands of Christian troops until 1102, when the Almoravids retook the city and restored the Muslim religion. Although the self-styled 'Emperor of All Spain', Alfonso VI of León and Castile, drove them from the city, he was unable to hold it. The Christians set it afire before abandoning it, and the Almoravid Mazdali took possession on 5 May 1109. The event was commemorated in a poem by Ibn Khafaja in which he thanked Yusuf ibn Tashfin for the city's liberation. The declining power of the Almoravids coincided with the rise of a new dynasty in North Africa, the Almohads, who seized control of the peninsula from the year 1145, although their entry into Valencia was deterred by the "Wolf King" Ibn Mardanis, King of Valencia and Murcia until 1171, at which time the city finally fell to the North Africans. The two Muslim dynasties would rule Valencia for more than a century.

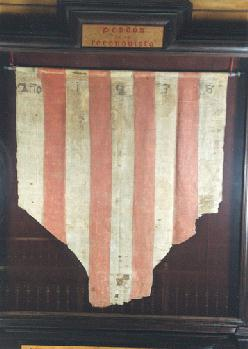
Pennon of the Conquest, the flag raised by the Moors of Valencia in 1238 to indicate their surrender to the troops of king James I of Aragon.

=== Christian Reconquest ===
In 1238, King James I of Aragon, with an army composed of Aragonese, Catalans, Navarrese and crusaders from the Order of Calatrava, laid siege to Valencia and on 28 September obtained a surrender. Fifty thousand Moors were forced to leave. Poets such as Ibn al-Abbar and Ibn Amira mourned this exile from their beloved Valencia. After the Christian victory and the expulsion of the Muslim population the city was divided between those who had participated in the conquest, according to the testimony in the Llibre del Repartiment (Book of Distribution). James I granted the city new charters of law, the Furs of Valencia, which later were extended to the whole kingdom of Valencia. Thenceforth the city entered a new historical stage in which a new society and a new language developed, forming the basis of the character of the Valencian people as they are known today.

On 9 October, King James, followed by his retinue and army, took possession of the city. The principal mosque was purified and the Mass was celebrated. James incorporated city and territory into the newly formed Kingdom of Valencia (continuum of the previous state), one of the kingdoms forming the Crown of Aragon, and permitted all people that lived in the city, Jews, Muslims and Christians, to stay there and live as citizens of the kingdom.

The city went through serious troubles in the mid-14th century. On the one hand was the decimation of the population by the Black Death of 1348 and subsequent years of epidemics — and on the other, the series of wars and riots that followed. Among these were the War of the Union, a citizen revolt against the excesses of the monarchy, led by Valencia as the capital of the kingdom—and the war with Castile, which forced the hurried raising of a new wall to resist Castilian attacks in 1363 and 1364. In these years the coexistence of the three communities that occupied the city—Christian, Jewish and Muslim — was quite contentious. The Jews who occupied the area around the waterfront had progressed economically and socially, and their quarter gradually expanded its boundaries at the expense of neighbouring parishes. Meanwhile, Muslims who remained in the city after the conquest were entrenched in a Moorish neighbourhood next to the present-day market Mosen Sorel.

In July 1391, Valencia was swept into a wave of anti-Jewish violence that had begun earlier that year in Seville and spread throughout Castile and into the Crown of Aragon. On July 9, a mob incited by religious fervor and external agitation attacked the city's Jewish quarter. The violence was reportedly triggered by a procession of youths shouting that “the Archdeacon of Castile is coming with his cross and that all the Jews should be baptized or die." Though the Archdeacon himself was not present, the attack mirrored the patterns of forced conversions and mass killings seen elsewhere in Iberia. The assault led to the virtual disappearance of Valencia's Jewish community, as many were murdered and the survivors forced to convert to Christianity. The Muslim quarter was attacked during a similar tumult among the populace in 1456, but the consequences were minor. The persecutions and expulsions prompted Jews from Valencia to seek new homes beyond Spain, settling in locations such as Vlorë and Salonica.

== Golden Age of Valencia ==
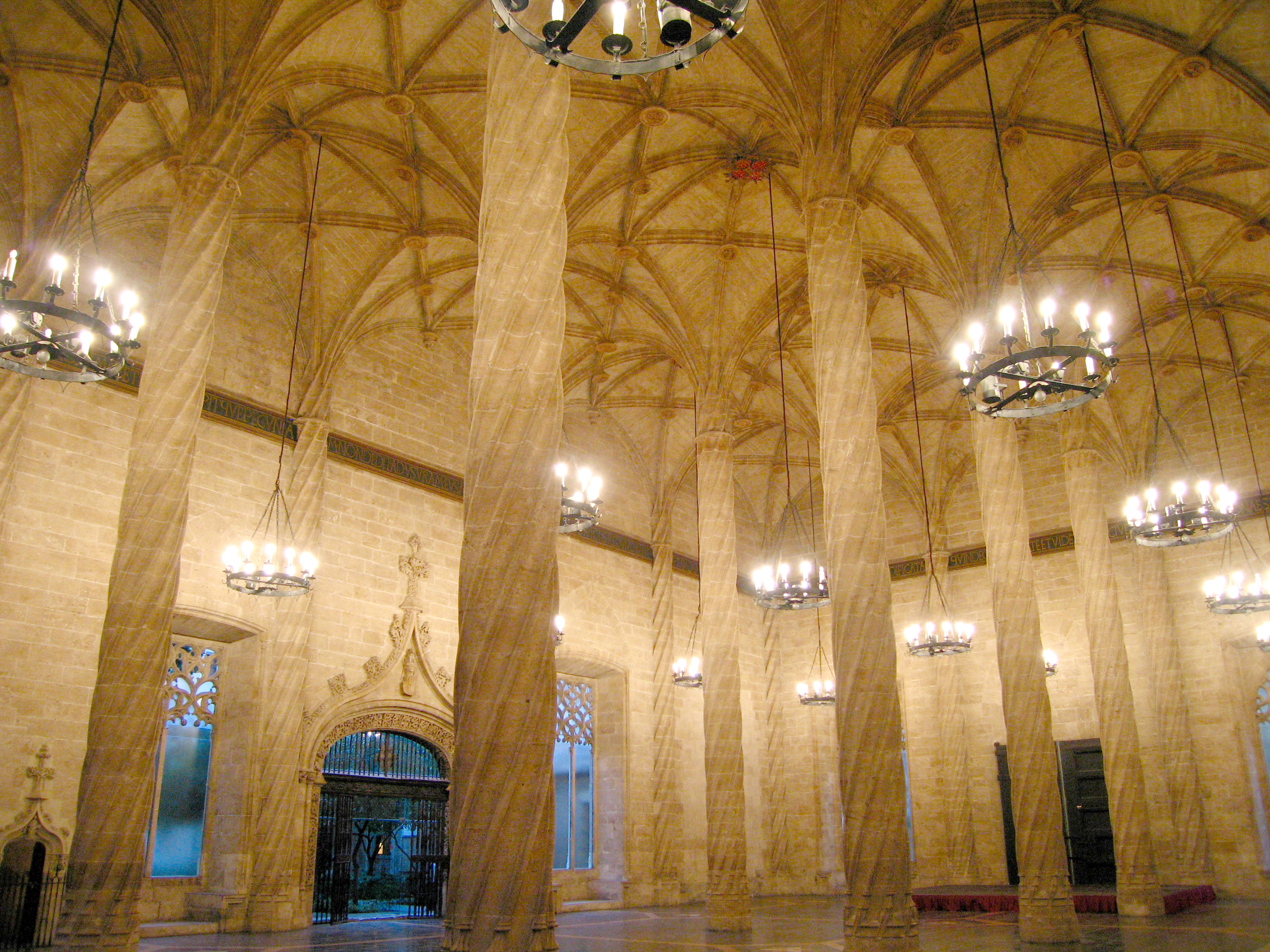
Hall of Columns in the Silk Exchange (Lonja de la Seda)

The 15th century was a time of economic expansion, known as the Valencian Golden Age, in which culture and the arts flourished. Concurrent population growth made Valencia the most populous city in the Crown of Aragon. Local industry, led by textile production, reached a great development, and a financial institution, the Taula de canvi, was created to support municipal banking operations; Valencian bankers lent funds to Queen Isabella I of Castile for Columbus's voyage in 1492. At the end of the century the Silk Exchange (Llotja de la Seda) building was erected as the city became a commercial emporium that attracted merchants from all over Europe.

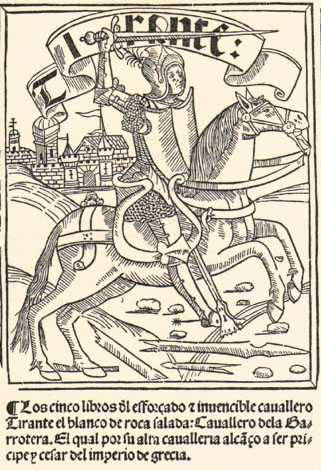
Tirant lo Blanch, a chivalric romance written by the Valencian knight Joanot Martorell.

This boom was reflected in the growth of artistic and cultural pursuits. Some of the most emblematic buildings of the city were built during this period, including the Serranos Towers (1392) and the Torres de Quart (1460), the Llotja (1482), the Micalet and the Chapel of the Kings of the Convent of Sant Doménec or Santo Domingo. In painting and sculpture, Flemish and Italian trends influenced Valencian artists such as Lluís Dalmau, Peris Gonçal and Damià Forment. Literature flourished with the patronage of the court of Alfonso the Magnanimous, supporting authors like Ausiàs March, Roiç de Corella, and Isabel de Villena. By 1460 Joanot Martorell wrote Tirant lo Blanch, an innovative novel of chivalry that influenced many later writers, from Cervantes to Shakespeare. Ausiàs March was one of the first poets to use the everyday language Valencian, instead of the troubadour language, Occitan. Also around this time, between 1499 and 1502, the University of Valencia was founded under the parsimonious name of Estudi General ("studium generale", place of general studies).

Valencia was one of the most influential cities on the Mediterranean in the 15th and 16th centuries. The first printing press in the Iberian Peninsula was located in Valencia and Lambert Palmart and his associates began to print in 1473. This was due to the manager of the Valencian factory of the Great Trading Company of Ravensburg in Swabia. The second printed Bible in a Romance language, the Valencian Bible attributed to Bonifaci Ferrer, was printed in Valencia circa 1478.

== Early Modern ==
=== Spanish Empire ===
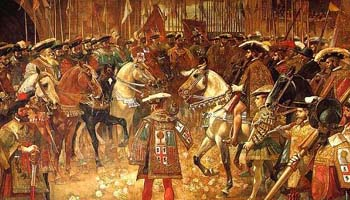
The Meeting of the Brotherhoods (La paz de las Germanías), by Marcelino de Unceta

Following the discovery of the Americas, the European economy was oriented towards the Atlantic to the detriment of the Mediterranean trade. Despite the dynastic union of Aragon with Castile, the conquest and exploitation of America was the exclusive domain of Castile. The Valencians, like the Catalans, Aragonese and Majorcans, were prohibited participation in the cross-Atlantic commerce.

Faced with this loss of trade, Valencia suffered a severe economic crisis. This manifested early in 1519–1523 when the artisan guilds known as the Germanies revolted against the government of the Habsburg king Charles I in Valencia, now part of the Crown of Aragon, with most of the fighting done in 1521. The revolt was an anti-monarchist, anti-feudal autonomist movement inspired by the Italian republics, and a social revolt against the nobility who had fled the city before an epidemic of plague in 1519. It also bore a strong anti-Islamic aspect, as rebels rioted against Aragon's population of mudéjars and imposed forced conversions to Christianity.

The vicereine Germaine of Foix brutally repressed the uprising and its leaders, and this accelerated the authoritarian centralisation of the government of Charles I. Queen Germaine favoured harsh treatment of the agermanats. She is thought to have signed the death warrants of 100 former rebels personally, and sources indicate that as many as 800 executions may have occurred. The agermanats are comparable to the comuneros of neighbouring Castile, who fought a similar revolt against Charles from 1520–1522.

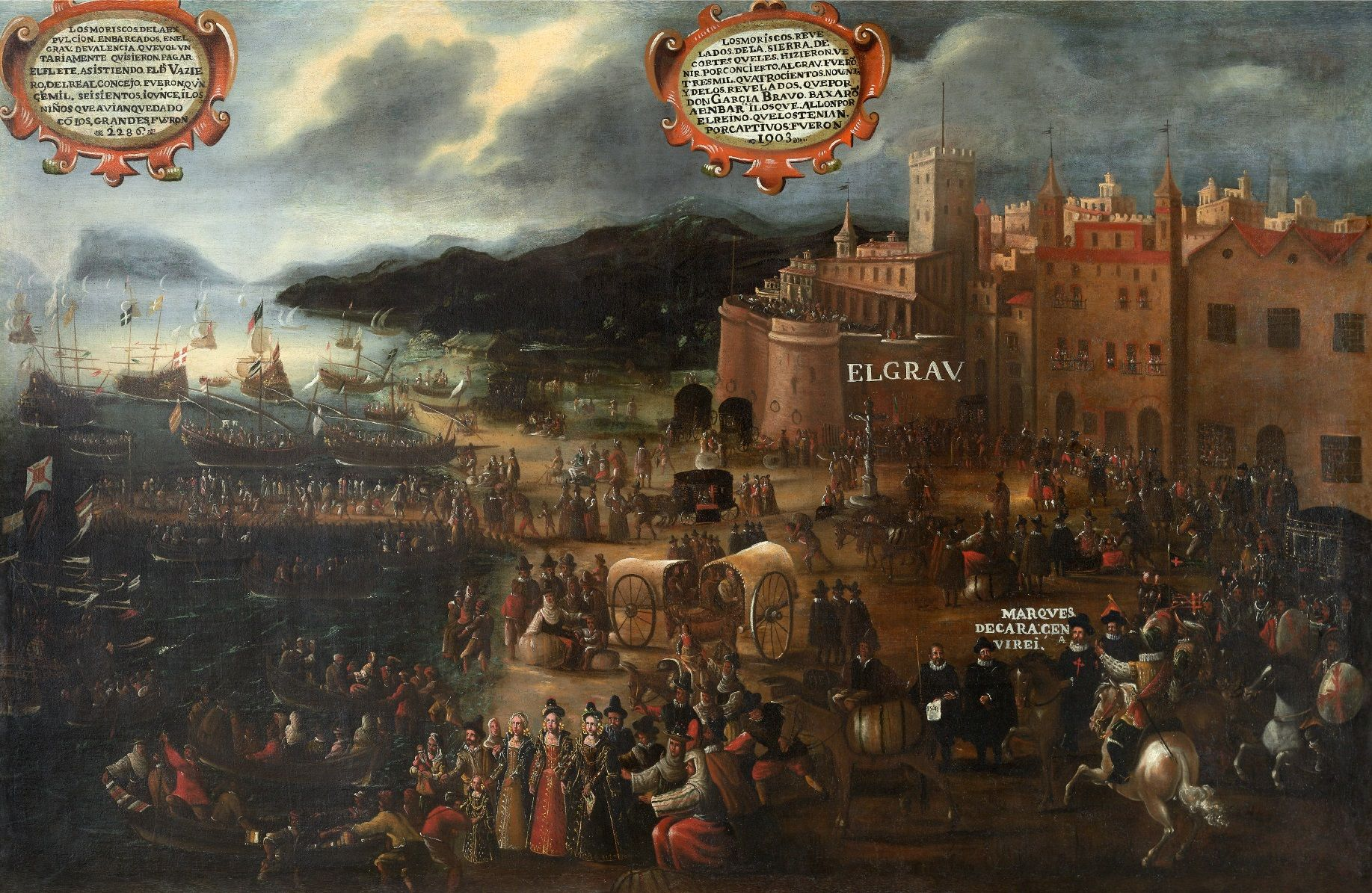
Expulsion of the Moriscos from Valencia Grau by Pere Oromig

The crisis deepened during the 17th century with the expulsion in 1609 of the Jews and the Moriscos, descendants of the Muslim population that converted to Christianity under threat of exile from Ferdinand and Isabella in 1502. From 1609 through 1614, the Spanish government systematically forced Moriscos to leave the kingdom for Muslim North Africa. They were concentrated in the former Kingdom of Aragon, where they constituted a fifth of the population, and the Valencia area specifically, where they were roughly a third of the total population. The expulsion caused the financial ruin of some of the nobility and the bankruptcy of the Taula de canvi in 1613. The Crown endeavoured to compensate the nobles, who had lost much of their agricultural labour force; this harmed the economy of the city for generations to come. Later, during the so-called Catalan Revolt (1640–1652), Valencia contributed to the cause of Philip IV with militias and money, resulting in a period of further economic hardship exacerbated by the arrival of troops from other parts of Spain.

=== Valencia under the Bourbons ===
The decline of the city reached its nadir with the War of Spanish Succession (1701–1714) that marked the end of the political and legal independence of the Kingdom of Valencia. During the War of the Spanish Succession, Valencia sided with Charles of Austria. On 24 January 1706, Charles Mordaunt, 3rd Earl of Peterborough, 1st Earl of Monmouth, led a handful of British cavalrymen into the city after riding south from Barcelona, capturing the nearby fortress at Sagunt, and bluffing the Spanish Bourbon army into withdrawal.

The English held the city for 16 months and defeated several attempts to expel them; English soldiers advanced as far as Requena on the road to Madrid. After the victory of the Bourbons at the Battle of Almansa on 25 April 1707, the English army evacuated Valencia and Philip V ordered the repeal of the privileges of Valencia as punishment for the kingdom's support of Charles of Austria. The victorious Franco-Castilan forces razed and burned the city to the ground, renaming it 'San Felipe'; its defenders were massacred as an exemplary punishment. By the Nueva Planta decrees (Decretos de Nueva Planta) the ancient Charters of Valencia were abolished and the city was governed by the Castilian Charter.

The Bourbon forces burned important cities like Xàtiva, where pictures of the Spanish Bourbons in public places are hung upside down as a protest to this day. The capital of the Kingdom of Valencia was moved to Orihuela, an outrage to the citizens of Valencia. Philip ordered the Cortes to meet with the Viceroy of Valencia, Cardinal Luis de Belluga, who opposed the change of capital because of the proximity of Orihuela, a religious, cultural and now political centre, to Murcia (capital of another viceroyalty and his diocese). Because of his hatred of the city of Orihuela, which had bombarded and looted Valencia during the War of Succession, the cardinal resigned the viceroyalty in protest against the actions of Philip, who finally relented and returned the capital to Valencia.

With the abolition of the charters of Valencia and most of its institutions, and the conformation of the kingdom and its capital to the laws and customs of Castile, top civil officials were no longer elected, but instead were appointed directly from Madrid, the king's court city, the offices often filled by foreign aristocrats. Valencia had to become accustomed to being an occupied city, living with the presence of troops quartered in the Citadel near the convent of Santo Domingo and in other buildings such as the Lonja, which served as a barracks until 1762.

The Valencian economy recovered during the 18th century with the rising manufacture of woven silk and ceramic tiles. The Palau de Justícia is an example of the affluence manifested in the most prosperous times of Bourbon rule (1758–1802) during the rule of Charles III. The 18th century was the age of the Enlightenment in Europe, and its humanistic ideals influenced such men as Gregory Maians and Perez Bayer in Valencia, who maintained correspondence with the leading French and German thinkers of the time. In this atmosphere of the exaltation of ideas the Economic Society of Friends of the Country (Societat Econòmica d'Amics del País) was founded in 1776; it introduced numerous improvements in agriculture and industry and promoted various cultural, civic, and economic institutions in Valencia.

== Late modern and contemporary ==
=== 19th century ===
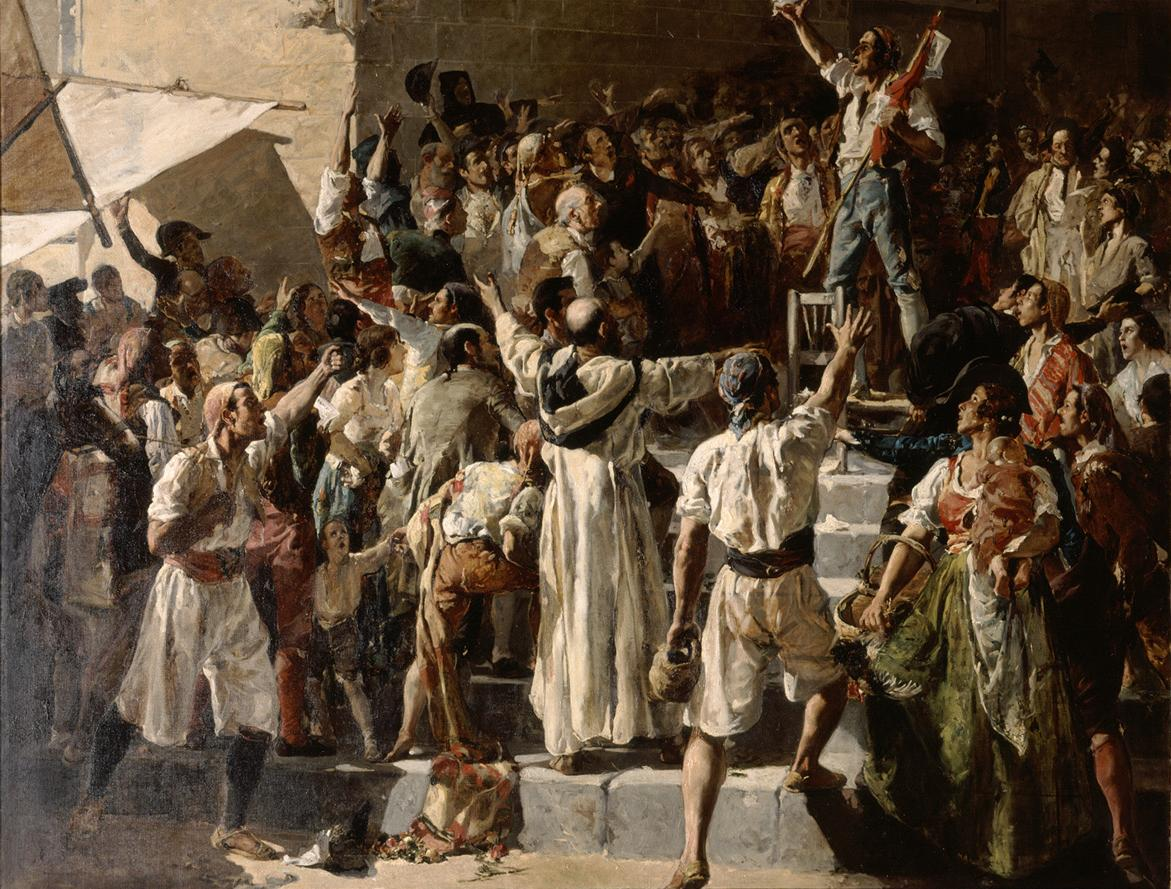
"The Cry of El Palleter", oil on canvas painting by Joaquín Sorolla

The 19th century began with Spain embroiled in wars with France, Portugal, and England—but the War of Independence most affected the Valencian territories and the capital city. The repercussions of the French Revolution were still felt when Napoleon's armies invaded the Iberian Peninsula. The Valencian people rose in arms against them on 23 May 1808, aroused by such persons as Vicent Doménech, known as "El Palleter", who shouted the words: "Un pobre palleter li declara la guerra a Napoleó; visca Ferran VII i muiren els traïdors!" ("A poor Palleter declares war on Napoleon. Long live Fernando VII and death to all traitors!") in the Plaza de les Panses, today called Plaça de la companyia. Doménech remains a symbol of the people's resistance to foreign invasion in Valencia.

The mutineers seized the Citadel, a Supreme Junta government took over, and on 26–28 June, Napoleon's Marshal Moncey attacked the city with a column of 9,000 French imperial troops in the First Battle of Valencia. He failed to take the city in two assaults and retreated to Madrid. Marshal Suchet began a long siege of the city in October 1811, and after intense bombardment forced it to surrender on 8 January 1812. After the capitulation, the French instituted reforms in Valencia, which became the capital of Spain when the Bonapartist pretender to the throne, José I (Joseph Bonaparte, Napoleon's elder brother), moved the Court there in the middle of 1812. The disaster of the Battle of Vitoria on 21 June 1813 obliged Suchet to quit Valencia, and the French troops withdrew in July.

During the Napoleonic invasion, the Valencians had sent representatives to the Cortes of Cádiz, where a liberal, anti-seigneurial national constitution was drafted. Ferdinand VII became king after the victorious end of the Peninsular War, which freed Spain from Napoleonic domination. When he returned on 24 March 1814 from exile in France, the Cortes requested that he respect the liberal Constitution of 1812, which seriously limited royal powers.

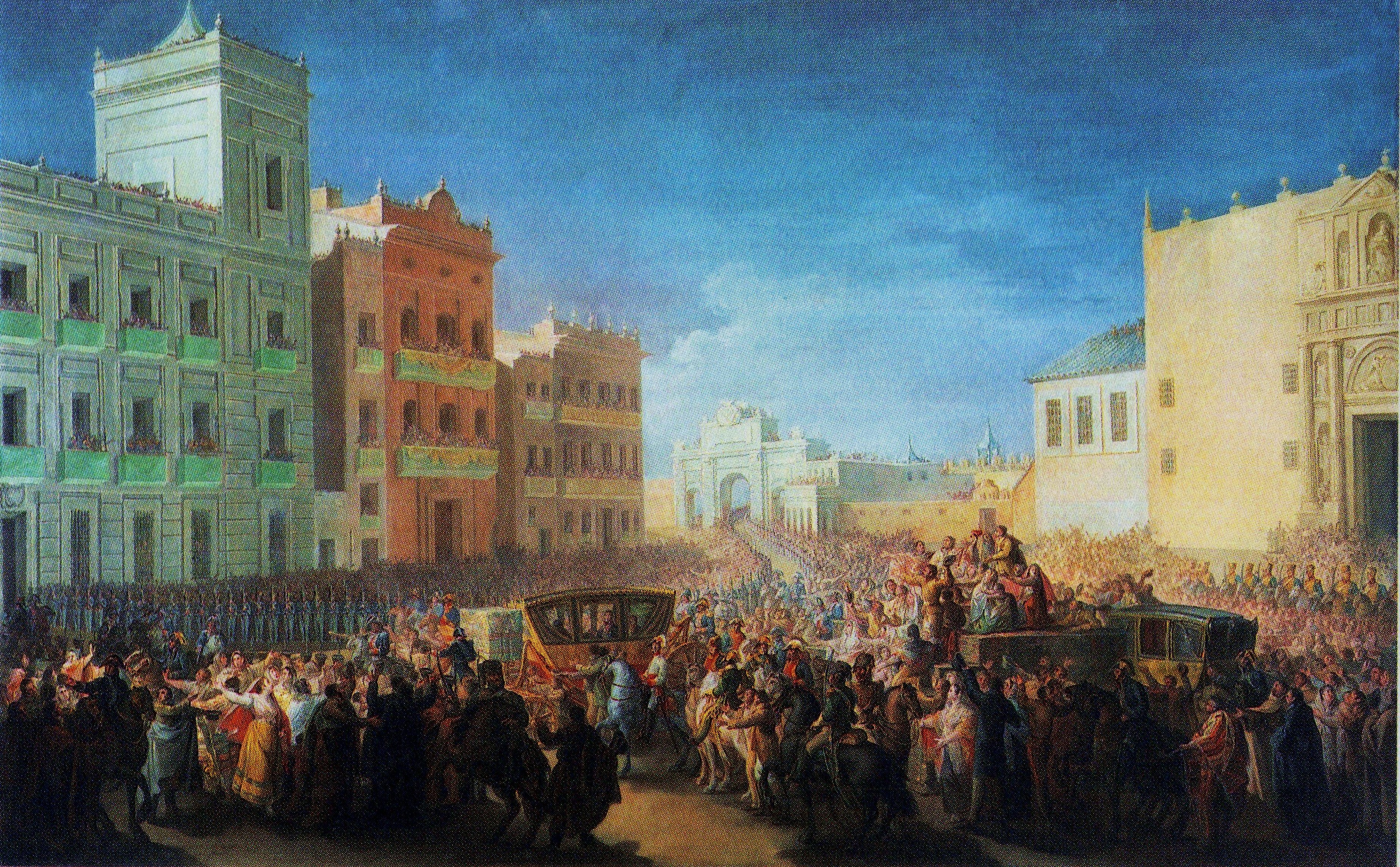
Triumphal welcome of Ferdinand VII of Spain at Valencia, 1814 by Miquel Parra

Ferdinand refused and went to Valencia instead of Madrid. Here, on 17 April, General Francisco Javier de Elío invited the King to reclaim his absolute rights and put his troops at the King's disposition. The king abolished the Constitution of 1812. He followed this act by dissolving the two chambers of the Spanish Parliament on 10 May. Thus began six years (1814–1820) of absolutist rule, but the constitution was reinstated during the Trienio Liberal, a period of three years of liberal government in Spain from 1820–1823.

A fervent follower of the absolutist cause, Elío had played an important role in the repression of the supporters of the Constitution of 1812. For this, he was arrested in 1820 and executed in 1822 by garroting. Conflict between absolutists and liberals continued, and in the period of conservative rule called the Ominous Decade (1823–1833), which followed the Trienio Liberal, there was ruthless repression by government forces and the Catholic Inquisition. The last victim of the Inquisition was Gaietà Ripoli, a teacher accused of being a deist and a Mason who was hanged in Valencia in 1824.

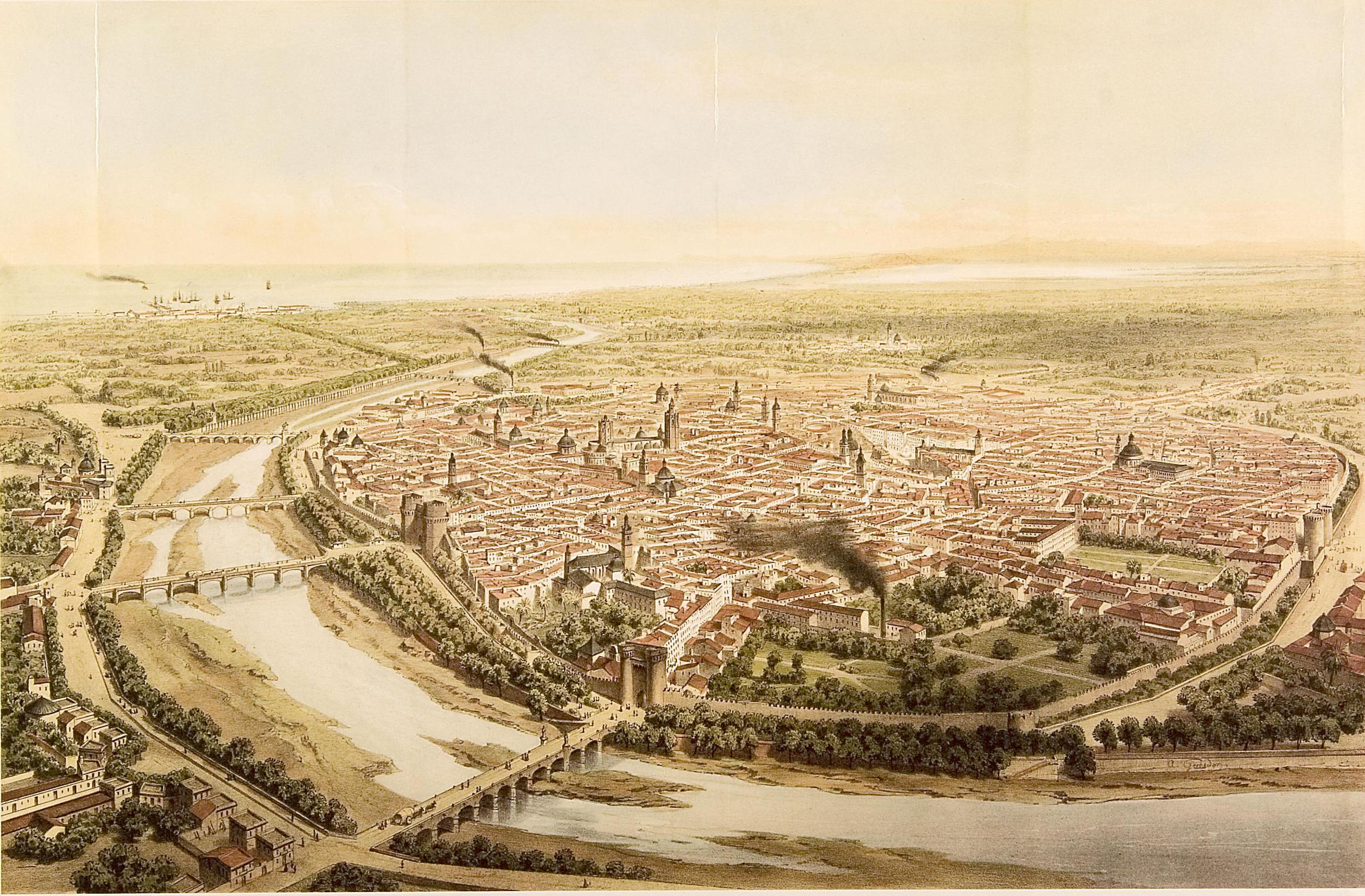
Valencia with its city walls in the 1830s, by Alfred Guesdon

On the death of King Ferdinand VII in 1833, Baldomero Espartero became one of the most ardent defenders of the hereditary rights of the king's daughter, the future Isabella II. On the outbreak of the First Carlist War, the government sent him to the front, where he decisively defeated the Carlists in many encounters. He was associated with the radical, or progressive, wing of Spanish liberalism and became its symbol and champion after taking credit for the victory over the Carlists in 1839.

During the regency of Maria Cristina, Espartero ruled Spain for two years as its 18th Prime Minister from 16 September 1840 to 21 May 1841. Under his progressive government the old regime was tenuously reconciled to his liberal policies. During this period of upheaval in the provinces he declared that all the estates of the Church, its congregations, and its religious orders were national property – though in Valencia, most of this property was subsequently acquired by the local bourgeoisie. City life in Valencia carried on in a revolutionary climate, with frequent clashes between liberals and republicans, and the constant threat of reprisals by the Carlist troops of General Cabrera.

The reign of Isabella II as an adult (1843–1868) was a period of relative stability and growth for Valencia. Services and infrastructure – including municipal water supply, paved roads, and gas distribution – were substantially improved, and a large-scale construction project was initiated at the port. Gas lighting was introduced in 1840, and soon after a public works project began to pave the streets with cobblestones, a task that took several years because of the lack of council funds.

The public water supply network was completed in 1850, and in 1858 the architects Sebastián Monleón Estellés, Antonino Sancho, and Timoteo Calvo drafted a general expansion project for the city that included demolishing its ancient walls (a second version was printed in 1868). Neither proposed project received final approval, but they did serve as a guide, though not closely followed, for future growth. By 1860 the municipality had 140,416 inhabitants, and beginning in 1866 the ancient city walls were almost entirely demolished to facilitate urban expansion. Electricity was introduced to Valencia in 1882.

During the Cantonal Revolution of 1873, a cantonalist uprising that took place during the First Spanish Republic, the city was consolidated with most of the nearby cities in the Federal Canton of Valencia (proclaimed on 19 July and dissolved on 7 August). It did not have the revolutionary fervor of the movement in cities like Alcoy, as it was initiated by the bourgeoisie, but the Madrid government sent General Martinez-Campos to stifle the rebellion by force of arms and subjected Valencia to an intense bombardment. The city surrendered on 7 August; Alfonso XII was proclaimed king on 29 December 1874, and arrived in Valencia on 11 January 1875 on his way to Madrid, marking the end of the first republic. Despite the Bourbon restoration, the roughly even balance between conservatives and liberals in the government was sustained in Valencia until the granting of universal male suffrage in 1890, after which the Republicans, led by Vicente Blasco Ibáñez, gained considerably more of the popular vote.

During the second half of the 19th century the bourgeoisie encouraged the development of the city and its environs; land-owners were enriched by the introduction of the orange crop and the expansion of vineyards and other crops. This economic boom corresponded with a revival of local traditions and of the Valencian language, which had been ruthlessly suppressed from the time of Philip V. Around 1870, the Valencian Renaissance, a movement committed to the revival of the Valencian language and traditions, began to gain ascendancy. In its early stages the movement inclined to the romanticism of the poet Teodor Llorente, and resisted the more assertive remonstrances of Constantí Llombart, founder of the still extant cultural society, Lo Rat Penat, which is dedicated to the promotion and dissemination of the Valencian language and culture.

In 1894 the Círculo de Bellas Artes de Valencia (Circle of Fine Arts in Valencia) was founded.

=== 20th century ===
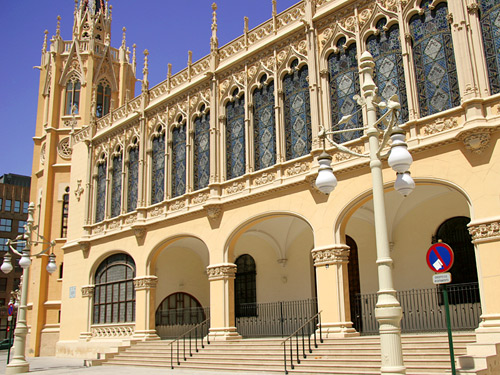
Palau de l'Exposició (Palacio de la Exposición), site of Regional Exhibition of 1909

During the 20th century Valencia remained the third most populous city of Spain as its population tripled, rising from 213,550 inhabitants in 1900 to 739,014 in 2000. Valencia was also third in industrial and economic development; notable milestones include urban expansion of the city in the latter 1800s, the creation of the Banco de Valencia in 1900, construction of the Central and Columbus markets, and the construction of the Gare du Nord railway station, completed in 1921. The new century was marked in Valencia with a major event, the Valencian regional exhibition of 1909 (La Exposición Regional Valenciana de 1909), which emulated the national and universal expositions held in other cities. This production was promoted by the Ateneo Mercantil de Valencia (Mercantile Athenaeum of Valencia), especially by its chairman, Tomás Trénor y Palavicino, and had the support of the Government and the Crown; it was officially inaugurated by King Alfonso XIII himself.

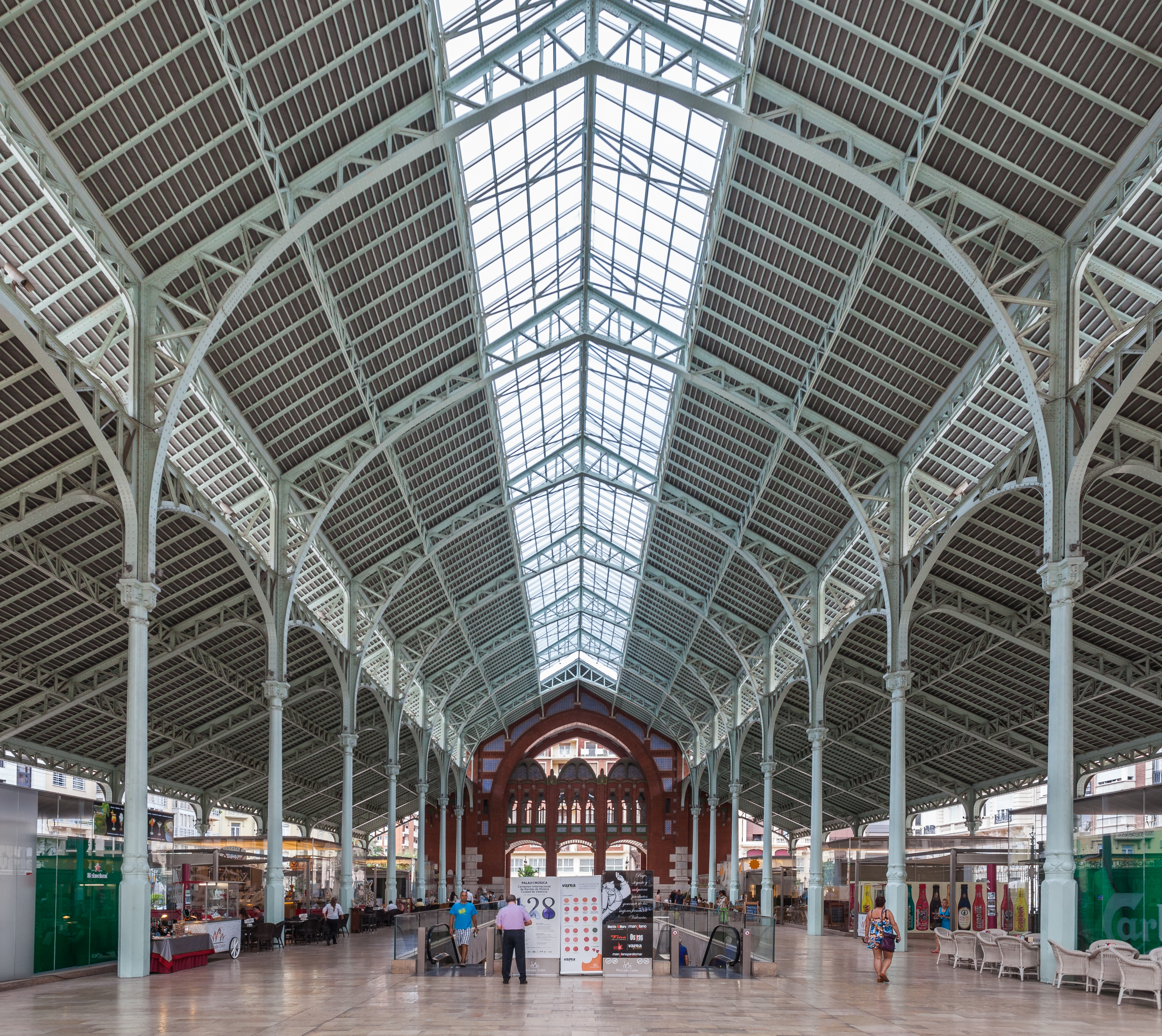
Interior of the Columbus Market (Mercat de Colón)

In the early 20th century Valencia was an industrialised city. The silk industry had disappeared, but there was a large production of hides and skins, wood, metals and foodstuffs, this last with substantial exports, particularly of wine and citrus. Small businesses predominated, but with the rapid mechanisation of industry larger companies were being formed. The best expression of this dynamic was in the regional exhibitions, including that of 1909 held next to the pedestrian avenue L'Albereda (Paseo de la Alameda), which depicted the progress of agriculture and industry. Among the most architecturally successful buildings of the era were those designed in the Art Nouveau style, such as the North Station (Estació del Nord) and the Central and Columbus markets.

Industrial workers began to organise in increasing numbers to demand better living conditions. The Republican party of Blasco Ibáñez responded to these demands and gained enormous popular support, dominating the ruling council between 1901 and 1923.

World War I (1914–1918) greatly affected the Valencian economy, causing the collapse of its citrus exports. The establishment of the dictatorship of Primo de Rivera in 1923 tempered social unrest for some years, but not the growing political radicalisation of the working classes. The labor movement gradually consolidated its union organisation, while the conservative factions rallied around the Valencian Regional Right.

The Second Spanish Republic (1931–1939) opened the way for democratic participation and the increased politicisation of citizens, especially in response to the rise of Conservative Front power in 1933. This climate marked the elections of 1936, won by the Popular Front political coalition, which promoted the fervor of the masses. The military uprising of 18 July failed to triumph in Valencia. For some months there was a revolutionary atmosphere, gradually neutralised by the government.

The inevitable march to civil war and the combat in Madrid resulted in the removal of the capital of the Republic to Valencia. On 6 November 1936, the city became the capital of Republican Spain under the control of Prime Minister Manuel Azaña; the government moved to the Palau de Benicarló, its ministries occupying various other buildings. The city was heavily bombarded by air and sea, necessitating the construction of over two hundred bomb shelters to protect the population. On 13 January 1937 the city was first shelled by a vessel of the Fascist Italian Navy, which was blockading the port by the order of Benito Mussolini. The bombardment intensified and inflicted massive destruction on several occasions; by the end of the war the city had survived 442 bombardments, leaving 2,831 dead and 847 wounded, although it is estimated that the death toll was higher, as the data given are those recognised by Francisco Franco's government. The Republican government passed to Juan Negrín on 17 May 1937 and on 31 October of that year moved to Barcelona. On 30 March 1939, Valencia surrendered and the Nationalist troops entered the city. The postwar years were a time of hardship for Valencians. During Franco's regime speaking or teaching Valencian was prohibited; in a significant reversal learning it is now compulsory for every schoolchild in Valencia.

The dictatorship of Franco forbade political parties and began a harsh ideological and cultural repression countenanced and sometimes even led by the Church. The financial markets were destabilised, causing a severe economic crisis that led to rationing. A black market in rationed goods existed for over a decade. The Francoist administrations of Valencia repressed publicity of the catastrophic floods of 1949, which brought in their wake dozens of deaths, but could not do the same after the more catastrophic flood of 1957 when the river Turia overflowed its banks again, causing many casualties. The official death toll was 81 deaths; the real figure may be higher. To prevent further disasters, the river was diverted to a new course according to the Plan Sur established by the Cortes Españoles in Law 81 of 1961. The old river bed was abandoned for years, and successive Francoist mayors proposed making it a motorway, but that option was finally rejected with the advent of democracy and fervent neighbourhood protests. The river was divided in two at the western city limits and diverted southwards along a new course that skirts the city, before meeting the Mediterranean. The old course of the river continues, dry, through the city centre, almost to the sea. The old riverbed is now a sunken park called the Garden of the Turia (Jardí del Túria or Jardín del Turia) that allows cyclists and pedestrians to cross much of the city by avoiding the use of roads; overhead bridges carry motor traffic across the park.

The economy began to recover in the early 1960s, and the city experienced explosive population growth through immigration spurred by the jobs created with the implementation of major urban projects and infrastructure improvements. With the advent of democracy in Spain, the ancient kingdom of Valencia was established as a new autonomous entity, the Valencian Community, the Statute of Autonomy of 1982 designating Valencia as its capital. On the night of 23 February 1981, shortly after Antonio Tejero had stormed Congress, the Captain General of the Third Military Region, Jaime Milans del Bosch, rose up in Valencia, put tanks on the streets, declared a state of emergency and tried to convince other senior military figures to support the coup. After the televised message of King Juan Carlos I, those in the military who had not yet aligned themselves decided to remain loyal to the government, and the coup failed. Despite this lack of support, Milans del Bosch only surrendered at 5 a.m. on the next day, 24 February.

Valencia has since then experienced a surge in its cultural development during the last thirty years, exemplified by exhibitions and performances at such iconic institutions as the Palau de la Música, the Palacio de Congresos, the Metro, the City of Arts and Sciences (Ciutat de les Arts i les Ciències), the Valencian Museum of Enlightenment and Modernity (Museo Valenciano de la Ilustracion y la Modernidad), and the Institute of Modern Art (Instituto Valenciano de Arte Moderno). The various productions of Santiago Calatrava, a renowned structural engineer, architect, and sculptor and of the architect Félix Candela have contributed to Valencia's international reputation. These public works and the ongoing rehabilitation of the Old City (Ciutat Vella) have helped improve the city's livability and tourism is continually increasing.

=== 21st century ===
The Valencia Metro derailment occurred on 3 July 2006 at 1 pm. CEST (1100 UTC) between Jesús and Plaça d'Espanya stations on Line 1 of the Metrovalencia mass transit system. Forty-three people were killed and more than ten were seriously injured. It was not immediately clear what caused the crash. Both the Valencian government spokesman Vicente Rambla and Mayor Rita Barberá called the accident a "fortuitous" event. However, the trade union CC.OO. accused the authorities of "rushing" to say anything but admit that Line 1 is in a state of "constant deterioration" with a "failure to carry out maintenance".

In March 2012, the newspaper El Mundo published a story according to which FGV had instructed employees who were to testify at the crash commission investigation, providing a set of possible questions and guidelines to prepare the answers. In April 2013, the television program Salvados questioned the official version of the incident as there were indications that the Valencian Government had tried to downplay the accident, which coincided with the visit of the pope to Valencia, or even to hide evidence, as the record book of train breakdowns was never found. The day after the broadcast of this report, which received extensive media coverage, several voices called for the reopening of the investigation. The investigation was effectively reopened and the accident is currently under re-examination.

On 9 July 2006, the World Day of Families, during Mass at Valencia's Cathedral, Our Lady of the Forsaken Basilica, Pope Benedict XVI used the Santo Caliz, a 1st-century Middle-Eastern artifact that some Catholics believe is the Holy Grail. It was supposedly brought to that church by Emperor Valerian in the 3rd century, after having been brought by St. Peter to Rome from Jerusalem. The Santo Caliz (Holy Chalice) is a simple, small stone cup. Its base was added in the Middle Ages and consists of fine gold, alabaster and gem stones.

Valencia was selected in 2003 to host the historic America's Cup yacht race, the first European city ever to do so. The America's Cup matches took place from April to July 2007. On 3 July 2007, Alinghi defeated Team New Zealand to retain the America's Cup. Twenty-two days later, on 25 July 2007, the leaders of the Alinghi syndicate, holder of the America's Cup, officially announced that Valencia would be the host city for the 33rd America's Cup, held 8–14 February 2010.

In the Valencia City Council elections from 1991 to 2015 the City Council was governed by the People's Party of Spain (Partido Popular) (PP) and Mayor Rita Barberá Nolla who became mayor by a pact made with the Valencian Union. She was a member of the National Council of the People's Party and a Representative in the Valencian regional Parliament (Corts Valencianes). She turned down an offer to become a national deputy at the 2008 Spanish General Election. A leftist coalition headed by new mayor Joan Ribó of Coalició Compromís won the 2015 election for the Valencia City Council.

== Population ==
Date	Population
1360	30,000
15th century	70,000

== See also ==
- Timeline of Valencia
