= Timeline of Valencia =

The following is a timeline of the history of the city of Valencia, Spain.

== Prior to 20th century ==
- 137 BCE – Foundation of Valentia Edetanorum ^{es} by the Romans.
- 413 – Taken by the Visigoths.
- 714 – Taken by Moors.
- 1010 CE – City becomes capital of the Taifa of Valencia.
- 1021 – Independent Moorish kingdom of Valencia was established
- 1064 CE – Al-Mamun of Toledo in power.
- 1094 – Castilian Rodrigo Díaz de Vivar in power.
- 1109 – Almoravid Masdali in power.
- 1147 – Ibn Mardanish re-establishes Taifa of Valencia, uniting it with Murcia
- 1172 – Almohad Caliphate takes control
- 1229 – Taifa re-established by Zayyan Ibn Mardanish
- 1238 – City conquered by the Christians and becomes capital of the Aragonese Kingdom of Valencia.
- 1261 – Furs of Valencia (law) promulgated.
- 1262 – Valencia Cathedral construction begins.
- 1283 – Consulate of the Sea established.
- 1349 – Torres de Serranos (gate) built.
- 1380 – Public clock installed (approximate date).
- 1391 – Massacre of 1391 against the Jews of Valencia
- 1444 – Torres de Quart (gate) built.
- 1459 – Valencia Cathedral lengthened in its original Gothic style.
- 1473 – Printing press in use.
- 1474 – "Poetical contest" held.
- 1483 – Llotja de la Seda construction begins.
- 1499 – University of Valencia founded.
- 1568 – Juan de Ribera becomes Archbishop of Valencia.
- 1707 – Bourbons in power.
- 1776 – Real Sociedad Económica Valenciana de Amigos del País established.
- 1812 – 9 January: City taken by French forces ^{es} and the library robbed of its 60,000 volumes.
- 1840 – Domingo Mascarós ^{es} becomes mayor.
- 1859 – Plaza de Toros de Valencia officially opens.
- 1868 — Plaza de la Reina begins with a small triangular plaza.
- 1887 – Population: 170,763.
- 1897 – Population: 204,768.

== 20th century ==
- 1913 – Museu de Belles Arts de València established.
- 1915 – Teatro Olympia ^{es} opens.
- 1917 – Estació del Nord (railway station) opens.
- 1930 – Population: 320,195.
- 1933
  - December: "Anarchist uprising ^{es}."
  - Valencia Airport built.
- 1937 – The city becomes the capital of the Republican controlled Spain.
- 1940 – Population: 450,756.
- 1946 – Cine Majestic (cinema) opens.
- 1957 – October: 1957 Valencia flood.
- 1958 – Adolfo Rincón de Arellano Garcia becomes mayor.
- 1970 – Population: 653,690.
- 1970 - Plaza de la Reina completed.
- 1984 – Cofrentes Nuclear Power Plant commissioned in region of city of Valencia.
- 1988 – Ferrocarrils de la Generalitat Valenciana (railway) begins operating.
- 1989 – Institut Valencià d'Art Modern opens.
- 1991 – Rita Barberá Nolla becomes mayor.
- 1995
  - Metrovalencia in operation.
  - Eduardo Zaplana becomes president of the regional Generalitat Valenciana government.

== 21st century ==
- 2006 – 3 July: Valencia Metro derailment (43 dead)
- 2013 – Population: 792,303.
- 2015 – Valencia City Council election, 2015 held; Joan Ribó elected mayor.
- 2022 - Plaza de la Reina renovation completed.

== See also ==
- Valencia history
- History of Valencia
- List of mayors of Valencia

Other cities in the autonomous Valencian Community:^{(es)}

- Timeline of Alicante

== Bibliography ==
Published in the 19th century

- Josiah Conder (1830), "Valencia", The Modern Traveller, London: J.Duncan
- Thomas Henry Dyer (1872) [1854]. "Valentia". In William Smith (ed.). Dictionary of Greek and Roman Geography. London: John Murray. hdl:2027/hvd.ah5cur.
- Richard Stephen Charnock (1894), "Valencia", Bradshaw's Illustrated Hand-book to Spain and Portugal, W.J. Adams & Sons, OCLC 36885426

Published in the 20th century

- "Valencia". Spain and Portugal (3rd ed.). Leipsic: Karl Baedeker. 1908. OCLC 1581249.
- "Valencia (city)" . Encyclopædia Britannica. Vol. 27 (11th ed.). 1910. pp. 845–846.
- Benjamin Vincent (1910), "Valencia", Haydn's Dictionary of Dates (25th ed.), London: Ward, Lock & Co.
- Ramón Ruiz Amado (1912). "Valencia". Catholic Encyclopedia. New York.
- Trudy Ring, ed. (1996). "Valencia". Southern Europe. International Dictionary of Historic Places. Vol. 3. Fitzroy Dearborn. pp. 734+. ISBN 9781134259588. OCLC 31045650.
