= Miguelete Tower =

Bell tower in Valencia, Spain

- El Miguelete
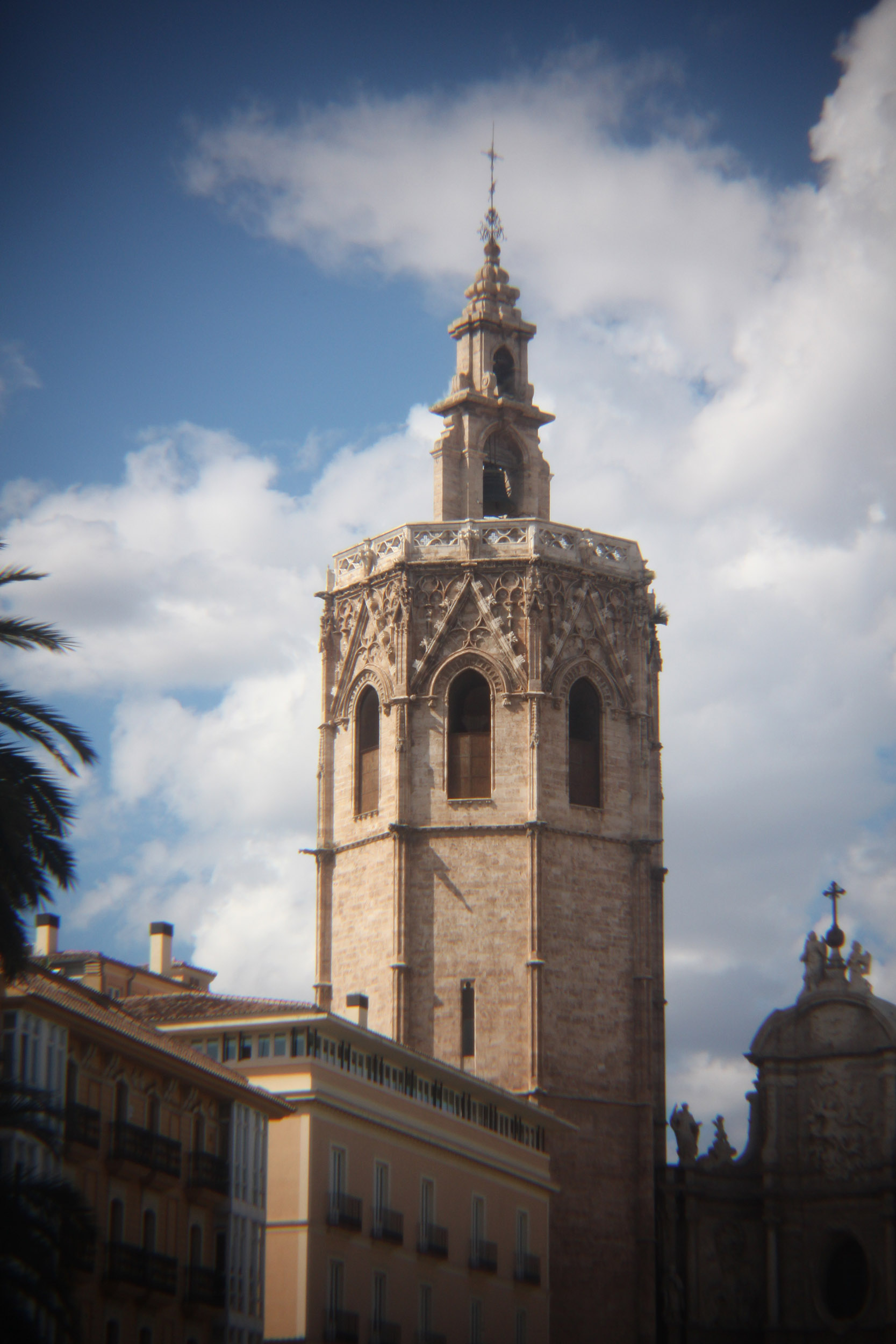
- The Miguelete Tower attached to the Valencia Cathedral
- Interactive map of the Miguelete Tower area
- Alternative names: Torre del Micalet Valencian language

General information
- Type: Bell tower
- Architectural style: Valencian Gothic
- Location: Plaça de la Reina, València, 46001, Valencia, Spain, Valencia, Valencian Community, Spain
- Coordinates: 39.4753°N 0.3756°W
- Construction started: 1381
- Completed: 1429

Height
- Height: 63 m. (206.7 ft.)

Design and construction
- Architects: Andreu Julià, Pere Balaguer

Website
- Official Cathedral Website

The Miguelete Tower is the bell tower of the Valencia Cathedral in Valencia, Spain. It is known as El Miguelete in Castilian Spanish or Torre del Micalet in the Valencian language. Construction of the tower began in 1381 and was completed in 1429. Due to its complexity and long years of construction, it was successively directed by several master builders; the first being Andreu Juliá, from 1381. Others were José Franch (1396), Pedro Balaguer (1414, builder of the Torres de Serranos); to Martí Llobet (1425), the last of the architects to work on the construction. Subsequently, the belfry was added (1660–1736).

== History ==
The Miguelete Tower is a Valencian Gothic style tower, it is 51 m. high to the terrace, and it is 63 m. (206.7 ft.) in total. It has the shape of an octagonal prism and has 207 steps.

For many centuries it was called "New Bell" or "Champ of the Cathedral", to differentiate it from the "Old Bell", a square tower with a Romanesque style that was located on Barchilla Street, but little remains of the original walls. Little by little its name changed to "Torre del Miguelete" after the great bell of the hours, which has served to name the whole by metonymy.

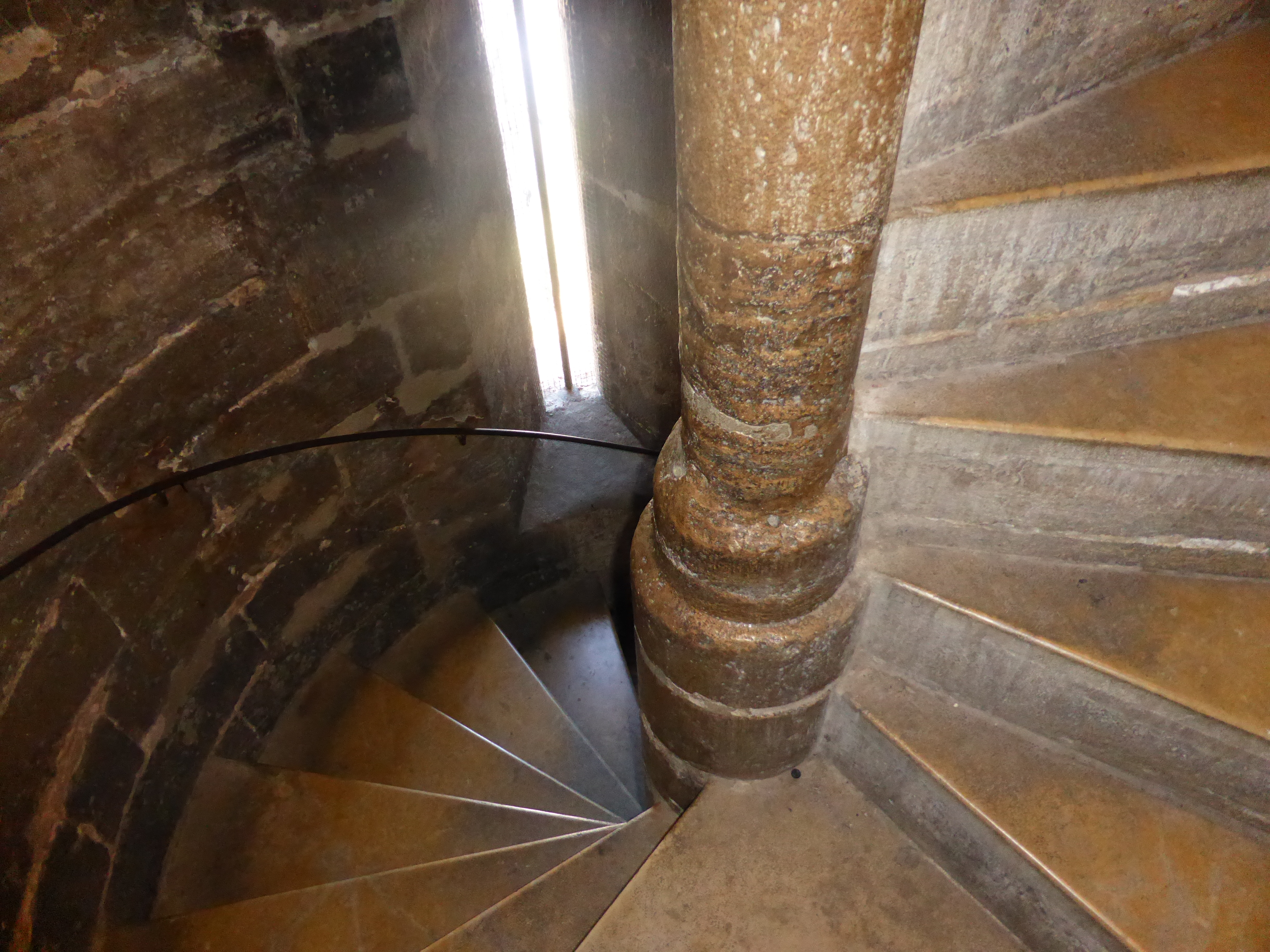
The spiral stairs of the Miguelete Tower

Originally it was a separate tower, and it was joined to the Cathedral at the end of the 15th century when the central nave was extended. It has access through an angular portal adorned with archivolts and a passage covered with curious ribbed turns. The octagonal tower measures 50.85 m, its perimeter being equal to its height, with external decoration of diagonal buttresses on the corners and the fine moldings that indicate the different levels of the floors.

The first level is solid, leaving only the gap for the spiral staircase. The second level has a vaulted enclosure, which is the old prison or Cathedral Asylum with a single exterior window. The third level is the "Home of the Bell-Ringer", another vaulted enclosure similar to the previous one although larger and with two windows. The upper floor is the bell room with eight windows, seven of them used by the bells. The eighth corresponds to the spiral staircase, which from here becomes narrower.

In 1425 the tower was already completed to the terrace, but the spire project conceived by Antonio Dalmau was not continued. The plans are preserved in the Municipal Historical Museum of Valencia.

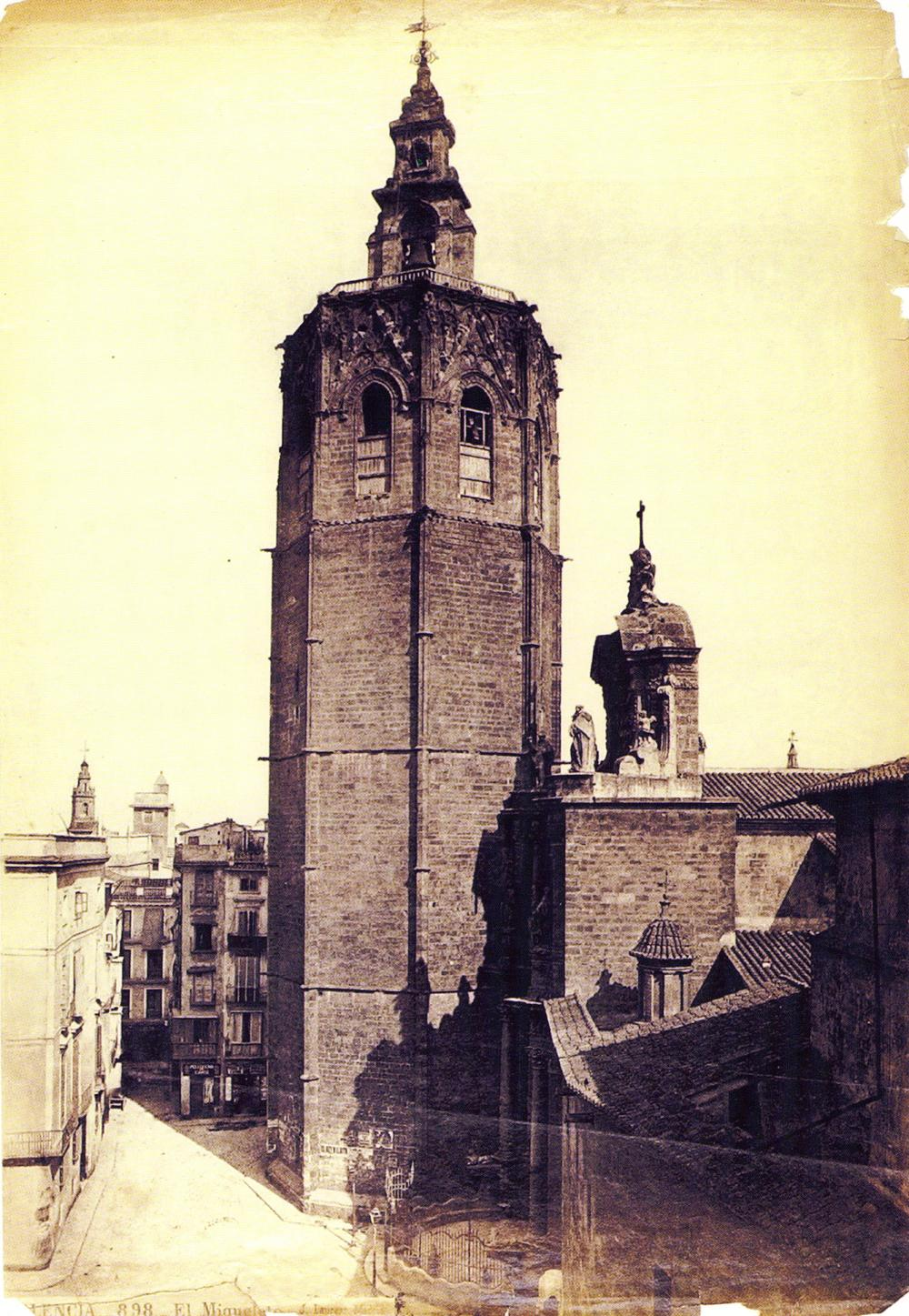
1870 drawing of the Miguelete Tower by J. Laurent

The bell of the hours, named El Miguelete, hung from a wooden structure, located on stone pillars, similar to that existing in many other bell towers of the Crown of Aragon. The current belfry is an attachment built between 1660 and 1736. The terrace had an elegant openwork or "pierced" crest that served as a crown and that was razed in the 18th century, being replaced first by a wooden railing and in the 19th century by a metal railing until the restoration of 1983.

The third level of the tower was often home to bell-ringers. The last bell-ringer who lived in the Miguelete Tower was Mariano Folch, who was in charge of the bells for more than sixty years and who died around 1905.

In 1940, the original set of eleven bells (six small and five large) had been altered with the addition of Eloy, a bell from the Santa Catalina Church tower, which at that time was about to become an icon in the middle of a prolonged Avenida de la Paz and the beginning of what would become the Plaza de la Reina. The entrance of this bell, very sonorous, modified the sound of the set.

=== 1980s Renovation ===
The bell room was not modified until the electrification of the bells, which meant the removal of the wooden doors, replaced yokes, ratchets, and the large beam from which the two trebel or minor bells hung. The traditional ringing of the cathedral bells consisted of ringing the five major bells. The others were rung for the dead and in exceptional cases for an extraordinary event. The electrification, carried out by The Roses Brothers of Adzaneta de Albaida, regardless of the original characteristics, consisted of the mechanization of six bells: two trebles, one of the medium ones, Barbara, and the three minor of the large ones (Vicente, Andrés and Jaime). The solemn ringing of the five major bells of the Cathedral shifted to a more parochial form with small, medium and large bells. Mechanization was carried out as an irreversible process, which had two consequences: due to limitations of the technology of the moment, neither the mechanisms reproduced the rich variety of local ringing style, nor did the facilities allow manual ringing.

Budgetary constraints allowed only six of the twelve bells existing at that time were mechanized. Therefore, six others remained in place with all their original installation. However, the limitations of the mechanization became evident when the Valencia Bell Tower Guild was commissioned to play for the 1988 Corpus Christi procession. Several bells required significant adjustments to ring, and one could not ring at all.

== Current State ==
The long continuous process of restoration and maintenance of the bells, facilities, and the bell tower as a whole, was carried out first by the Valencian Bell Tower Guild and now by their successors, the Bell Ringers of the Cathedral of Valencia. This has been possible through various sources of financing including direct subsidies from the Valencian Government or the City Council of Valencia via an annual line in the city budget.

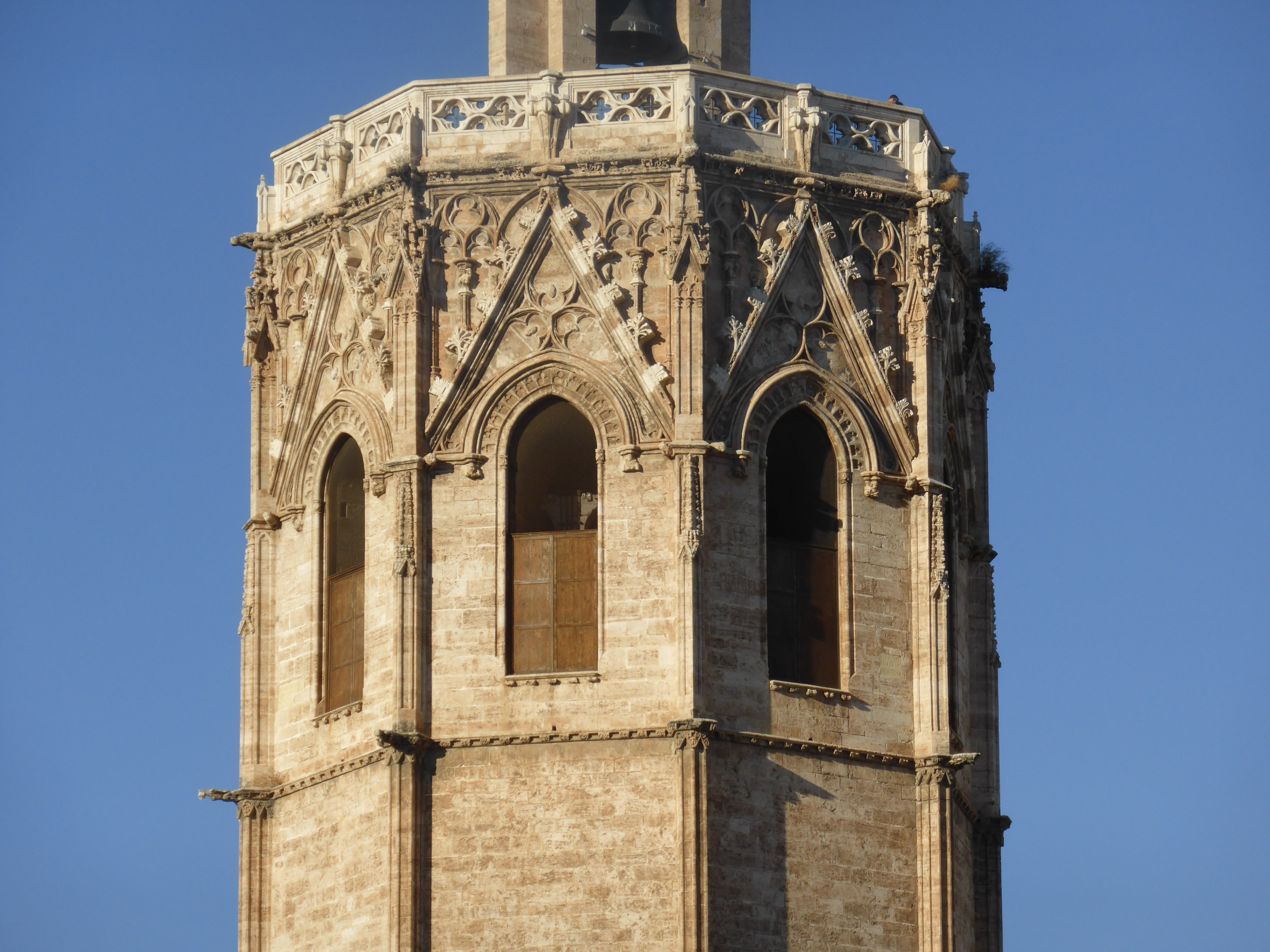
Bell room windows. Gothic style, from the beginning of the 15th century.

The six iron yokes of the machined bells were replaced with wooden yokes. The wooden windows that act as a loudspeaker were replaced, as well as the ratchets. The playing platform has been put at a safer height for the bell ringers, and this also allows them to better see their work. The rooms have been equipped with new electric wiring and new barred doors that allow visitors to see the interior even if closed.

Electronic mechanisms for daily and automatic ringing have been replaced twice due to the rapid evolution of technology. On 25 December 2014, the Jaume bell suffered a serious incident that has not been investigated and for the recovery of the bell a destructive, invasive and irreversible system was chosen, consisting of sawing the handles and drilling the crown thus mutilating the bell.

=== The Bells ===
The Cathedral of Valencia has three sets of bells, differentiated by their use, and therefore located in different places. The Bell Tower, and especially the set of bells, are in immediate operation.

On the deck of the dome, is the old signal bell that is now in disuse.

In the bell of the Bell Tower are the two bells of the clock: that of the quarters, from 1736 and the Miguelete, intended exclusively for playing the hours. The latter gives its name to the tower and is the largest that was used throughout the Crown of Aragon; it was first melted after agreement of 1418 and had to be recast several times: in 1465, 1484 and 1521, until it was last in 1539.

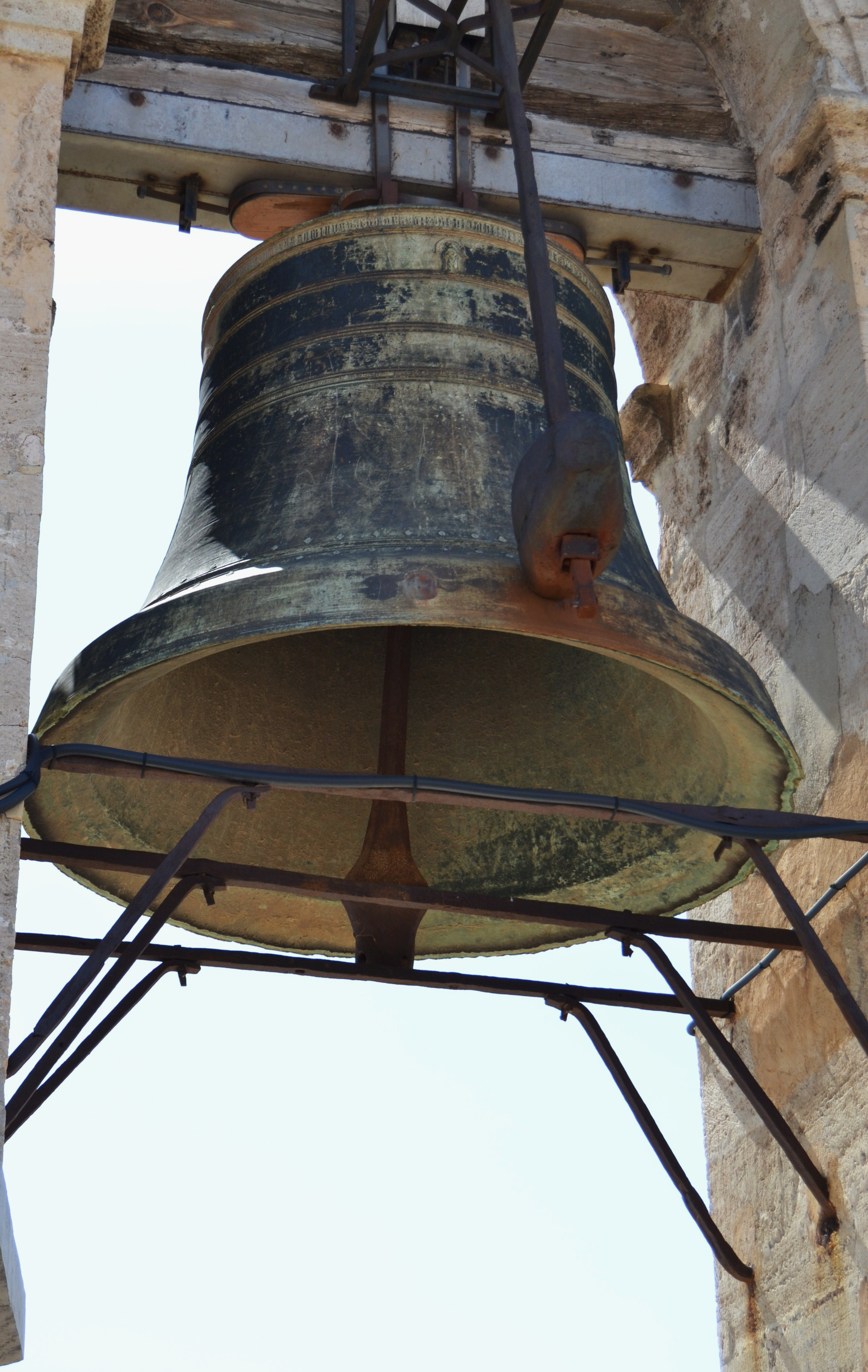
Bell called El Miguelete, or Micalet, to give the hours, in the belfry.

In the Bell Room there are eleven from the early construction of the building. In medieval times they spoke of "els cinc senys i les sis morlanes" and in more recent times of "the big five and six trebles". These are the ones used for the various daily, festival, funereal, and special events. The oldest is Catherine, from 1305, so far the oldest still in use across the entire Crown of Aragon. The newest is Violante, from 1735. The other trebles are Ursula (1438), Barbara (1681), Paul (1489), and Narcissus (1529). Of the great bells, Vincent (1569), Andrew (1604), Manuel (1621), Jaime (1429) and María (1544).

It is one of the most numerous sets of Gothic bells in all of Spain, with two large Gothic (Catalina and Jaime) and six smaller Gothic, Ursula, Pablo, Narciso, Vicente, Andrés and María, to which we add the Miguelete itself.

Only the ones in the windows and the Miguelete for the clock are automated. Barbara, for the daily choir ringing, as well as Manuel for ringing to close the city gates, and María for call to prayers. These three do not prevent manual ringing.

=== Traditional Bell Peals ===
The Bell Tower of the Cathedral of Valencia has had, since its origins, a written list of the bell peals, which was part of the "Consueta" or liturgical customs and uses of the cathedral. As a brief summary, the bells oscillated and rang at least since the middle of the 15th century and that in the 16th century the turn, or full circle ringing of all the bells prevailed, since it began with Mary, the largest of all. There were different chorus rings throughout the day, week, and year, and there were different rings according to the season. There were also peals for the dead, with a dozen different combinations, and festival peals, based exclusively on the turning of the five major bells, since the others do not dizen in the words of Canon Herrera, author of the famous Consueta of 1705. There was also no shortage of other peals such as for storms, those for taking souls out of purgatory, or those of alarm, as well as the closure of the city gates that was in charge of the City Council of Valencia.

However, the peals, over the centuries, were adapted to the needs of both the Cathedral and the city, evolving with them.

The electrification meant an absolute break with tradition, since only some of the bells that had to do so were turned, the chorus peals (replaced by bell flips) disappeared and those for the dead were reduced to the minimum expression. The peals, the most creative and ancient touch of the cathedral, which sounded no less than two hundred times a year, was stopped and faded from collective memory. They also canceled the daily signs of both prayer and closing the city walls. The new peals only announce masses: that original meaning of the bells of not only announcing but accompanying, with the loudest community music, the festive, painful or daily events of citizen life is currently lost.

=== Current Bell Peals ===
In the first years of the performances of the Valencian Bell Towers Guild some of the peals were still automatic, since four of the electrified ones retained their engines. However, after the great restoration of 1992, only Barbara's flip impulse engine, the bell that warns the daily choir, was left. External mechanisms had also been provided to play by pulling Manuel (daily peal to close the gates) and María (peal for prayers four times a day) by pulling the rope.

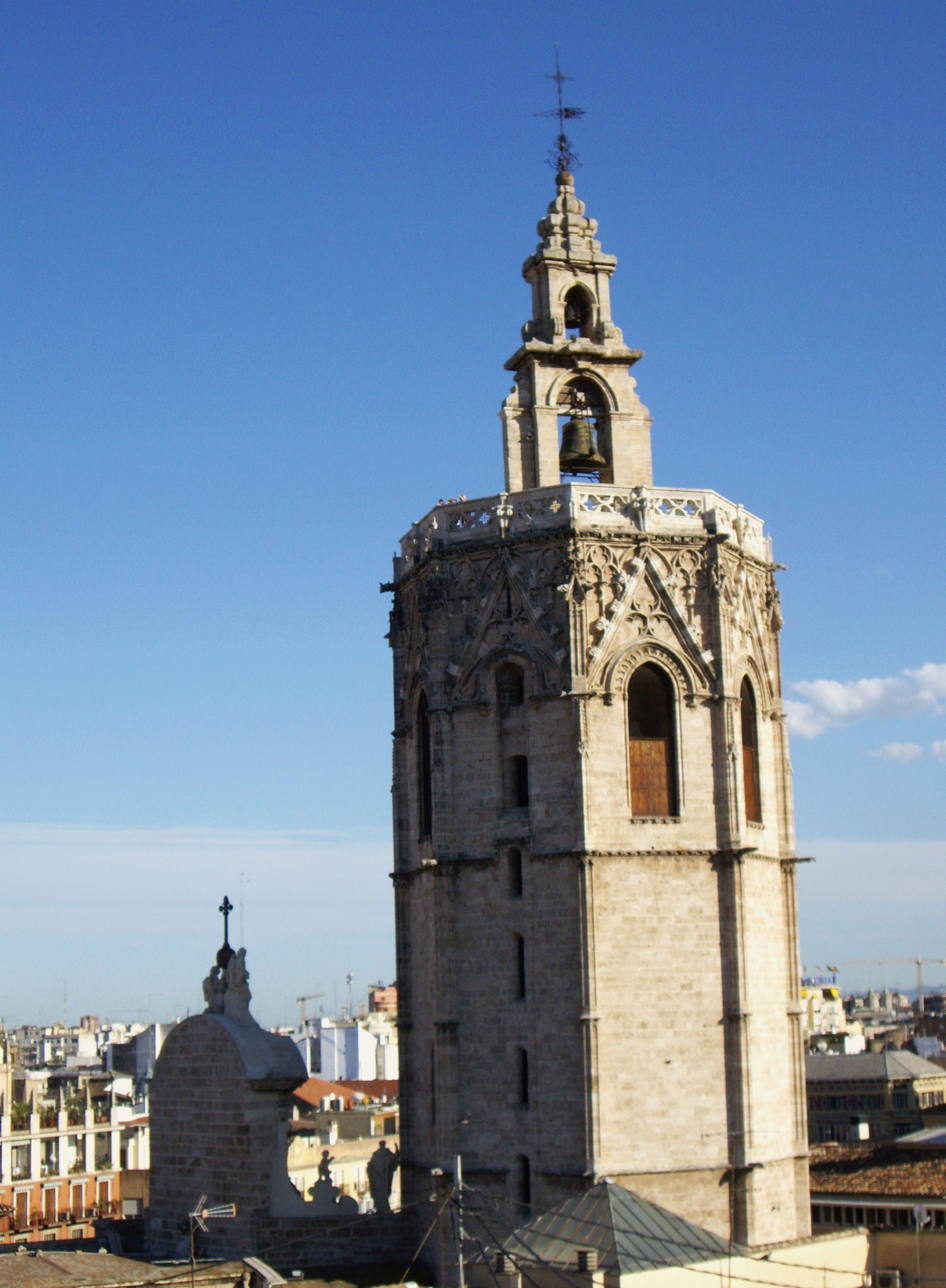
A view of the west side of the Miguelete Tower

Consequently, there are currently two distinct blocks of peals: automatic and manual. The automatic ones are limited to the prayer signs (three soundings of Maria's clapper for each of the three Angelus and five soundings of the clapper for the peal of Souls), Manuel's closing of city gates (for half an hour, first every two minutes and then accelerating to maximum speed), and Barbara's three choir flips at 09:01, 09:16 and 09:26, two pre-day and afternoon Angelus peals on Saturday and Sunday and one last peal for worship on Saturday at 7:45 pm.

The manual peals are interpreted by the Bell Ringers of the Cathedral of Valencia, which are an evolution of the Valencian Bell Tower Guild and who are part of the Valencian Federation of Bell Groups (Federación Valenciana de Campaneros). The Annual Calendar (which begins with Advent) includes all the annual liturgical feasts, as well as Advent and Lent Sundays, the peals of the eve of the solemnities in which they are sung in the cathedral and the great celebrations. All this is recorded in the Consueta Nova, based on the Consueta de Herrera of 1705, and updated to the current needs of both liturgical and citizen life. Thus, the announcement peals of the feast day from the day before at noon have disappeared (except for the festivities of the Virgin of the Forsaken and Corpus Christi) since the current bell ringers, volunteers, have work or study obligations, and live far from the historic center (which is more and more depopulated). Nowadays it makes more sense to touch the holidays at noon, with ringing or flipping depending on the holiday, to build the community holiday, when people walk through the historic center. There are three peals of dawn left: for the Virgin of the Forsaken, for Corpus Christi, and for the Assumption of Mary.

In general, the bells are turned with ropes, thus recovering traditional techniques of both stopping and flipping that the last bell ringers before electrification had perfected, as well as changing rhythms. The peal is facilitated by self-centered bearings so that most of the hoods, except Maria, Catalina, Narcissus, or Pablo that still retain the traditional installation, will be maintained as long as the hoods operate safely and without excessive effort.

== Visits ==
Visits to the Miguelete Tower are possible every day of the year by acquiring a ticket from the cathedral. After the performances of the Bell Ringers of the Cathedral of Valencia, visitors can see the three rooms of the bell tower through barred doors, and continue up to the terrace.

The management of the tower, except for visits to the bell room, is carried out by staff of the Cathedral Chapter.
