= Santa Catalina, Valencia =

St. Catherine's Church
- Iglesia de Santa Catalina
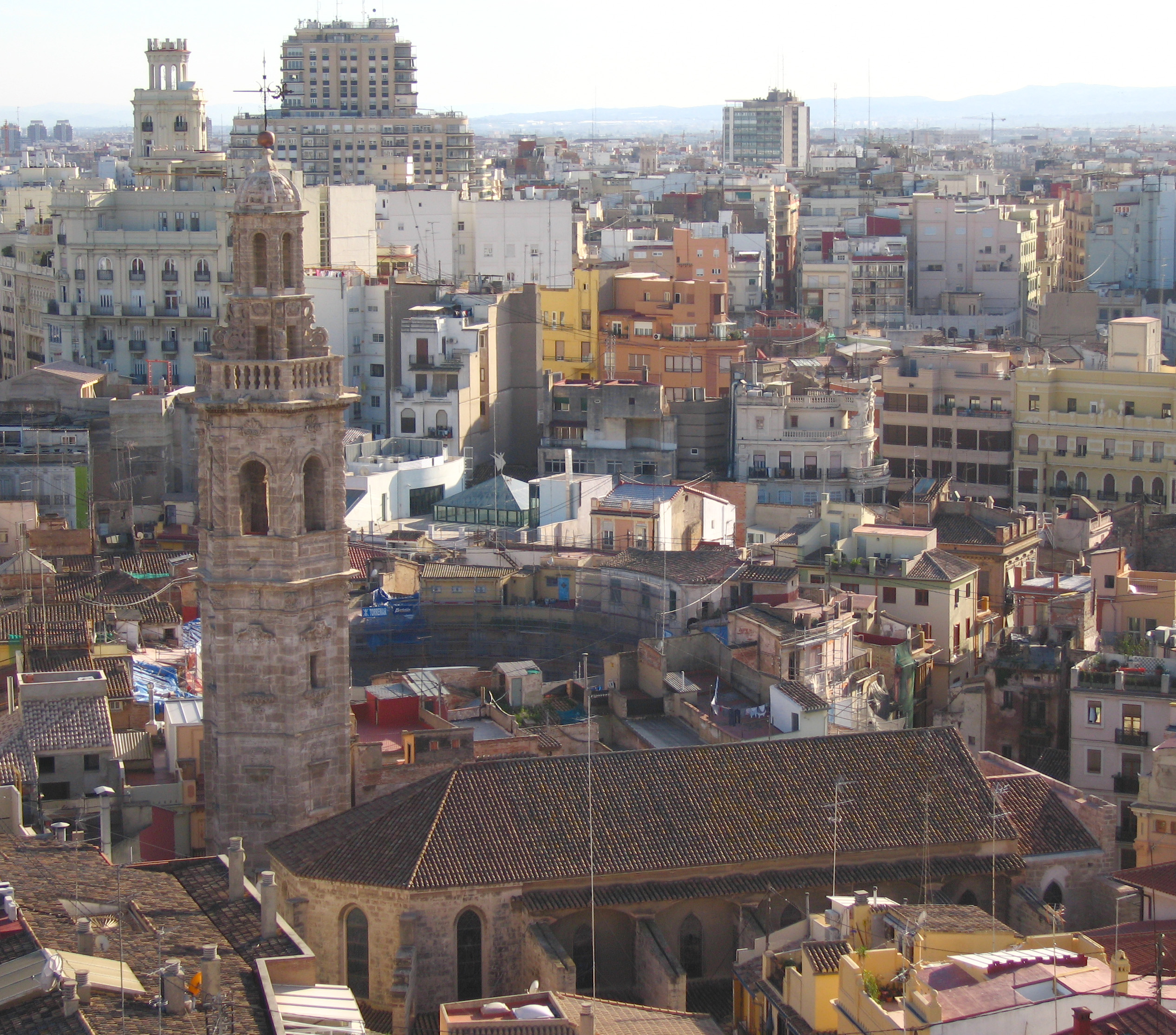
- St. Catherine's Church
- Location: Valencia
- Address: Plaza Lope de Vega
- Country: Spain
- Denomination: Catholic Church

History
- Status: Church
- Founded: 13th century
- Dedication: Catherine of Alexandria

Architecture
- Architectural type: Church architecture
- Style: Valencian Gothic

Administration
- Archdiocese: Valencia

St. Catherine's Church (Spanish: Iglesia de Santa Catalina; Valencian: Església de Santa Caterina) is a Gothic-style Catholic church located in the city of Valencia, Spain, at the southern end of Plaza de la Reina.

== History ==
St. Catherine's Church was built in the early 13th century at the site of a prior mosque. Most of the interior was rebuilt after a fire in 1548 acquiring the Baroque style. It has a 16th-century portal of classicist style. The imposing bell tower, with a hexagonal base and five levels, once the site of a minaret, was rebuilt in a Baroque fashion between 1688 and 1705 using the designs of Juan Bautista Viñes. Today still presents the 13th-century Gothic exterior. The church was restored in 1785.

The bells were melted in London in 1729 and later, in 1914, the clock was added. During the restoration carried out in 2012, when they went to repair the clock they realized that the machinery was relatively modern and had no value, so it was decided to remove it and adding again the old bell that had been removed in 1902.

In 1936, the church's interior was assaulted and burned by Republican militiamen. In the 1950s, what managed to be saved was restored, and some Neoclassical additions that covered the Gothic façade were removed.

== Gallery ==
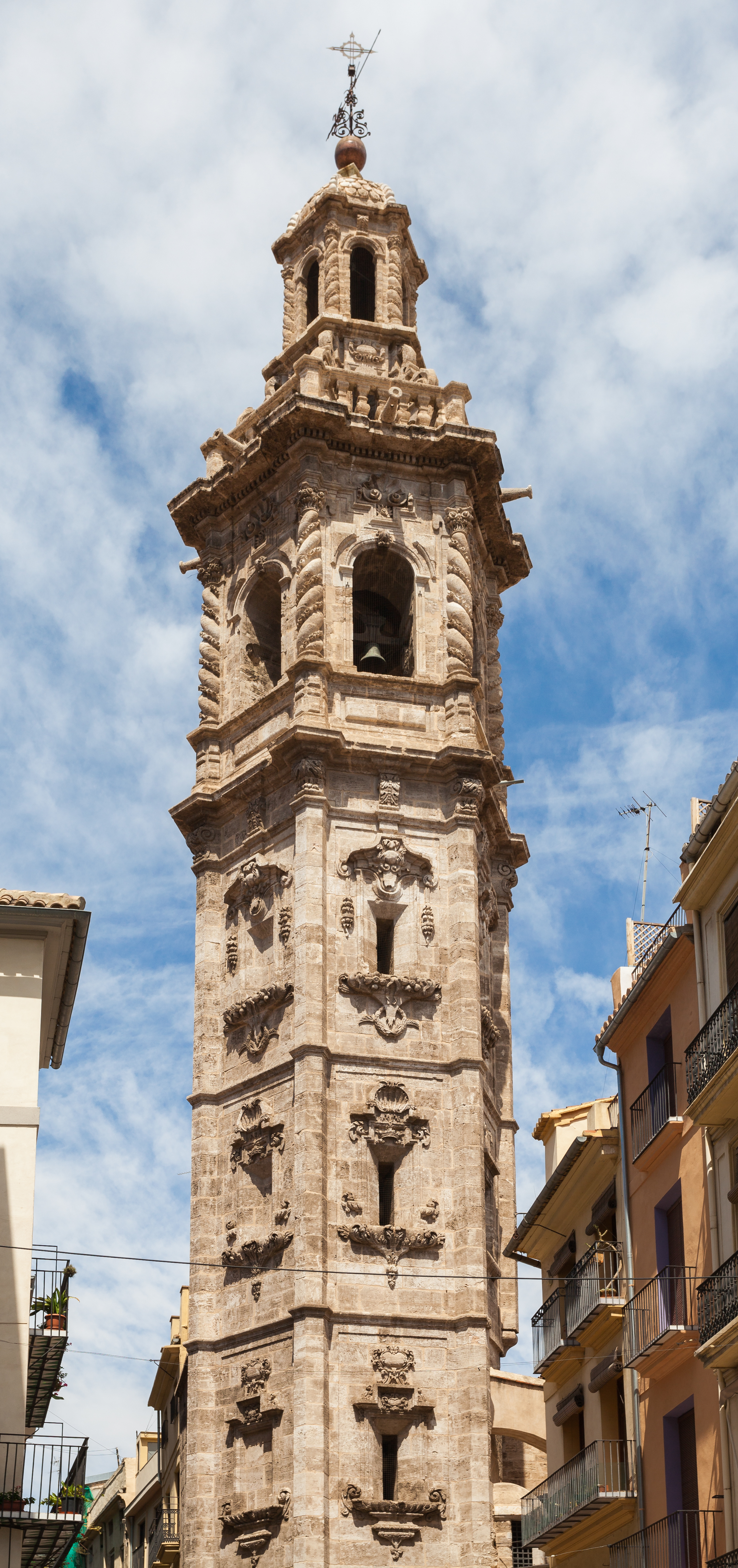
Baroque belfry

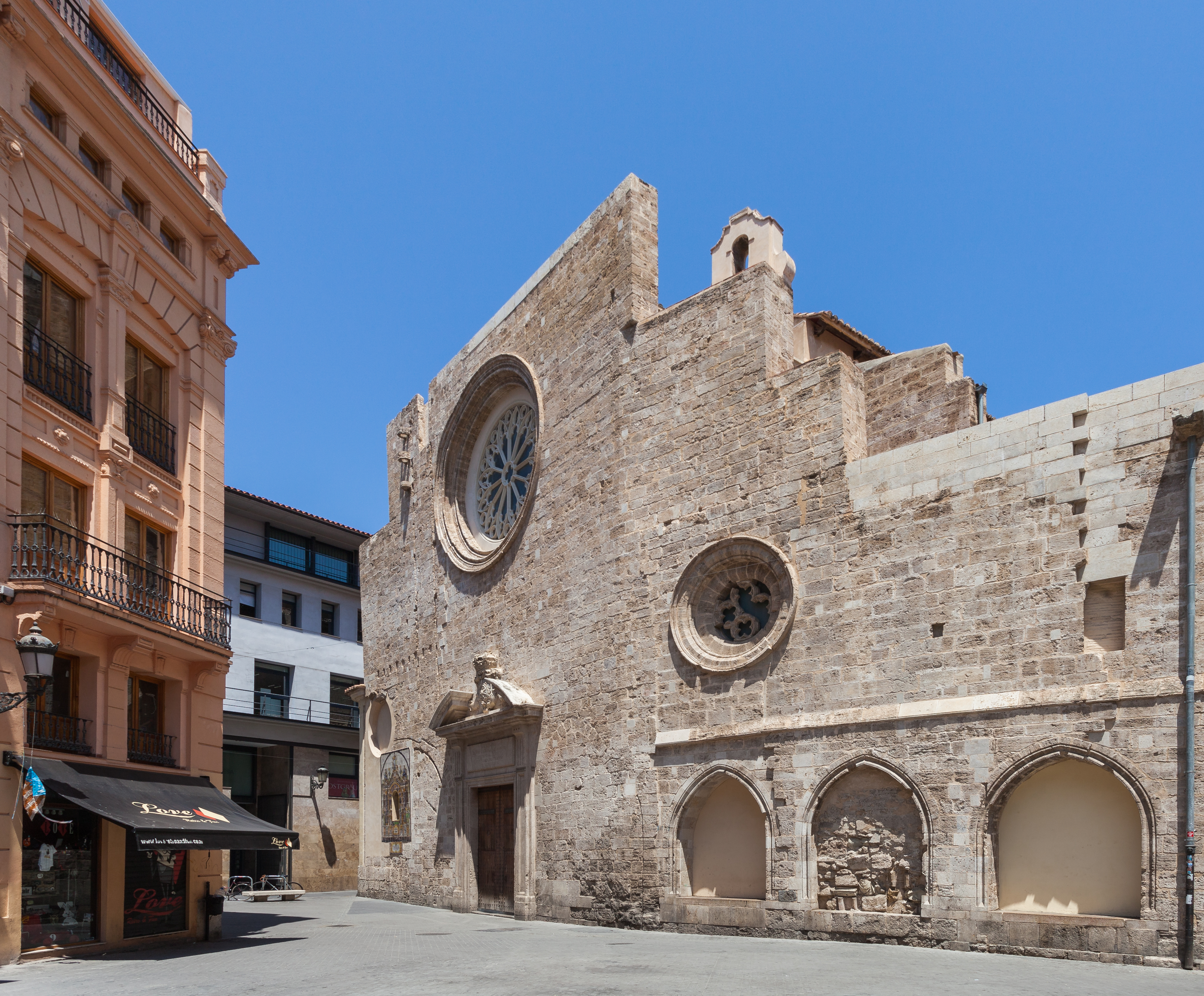
Façade

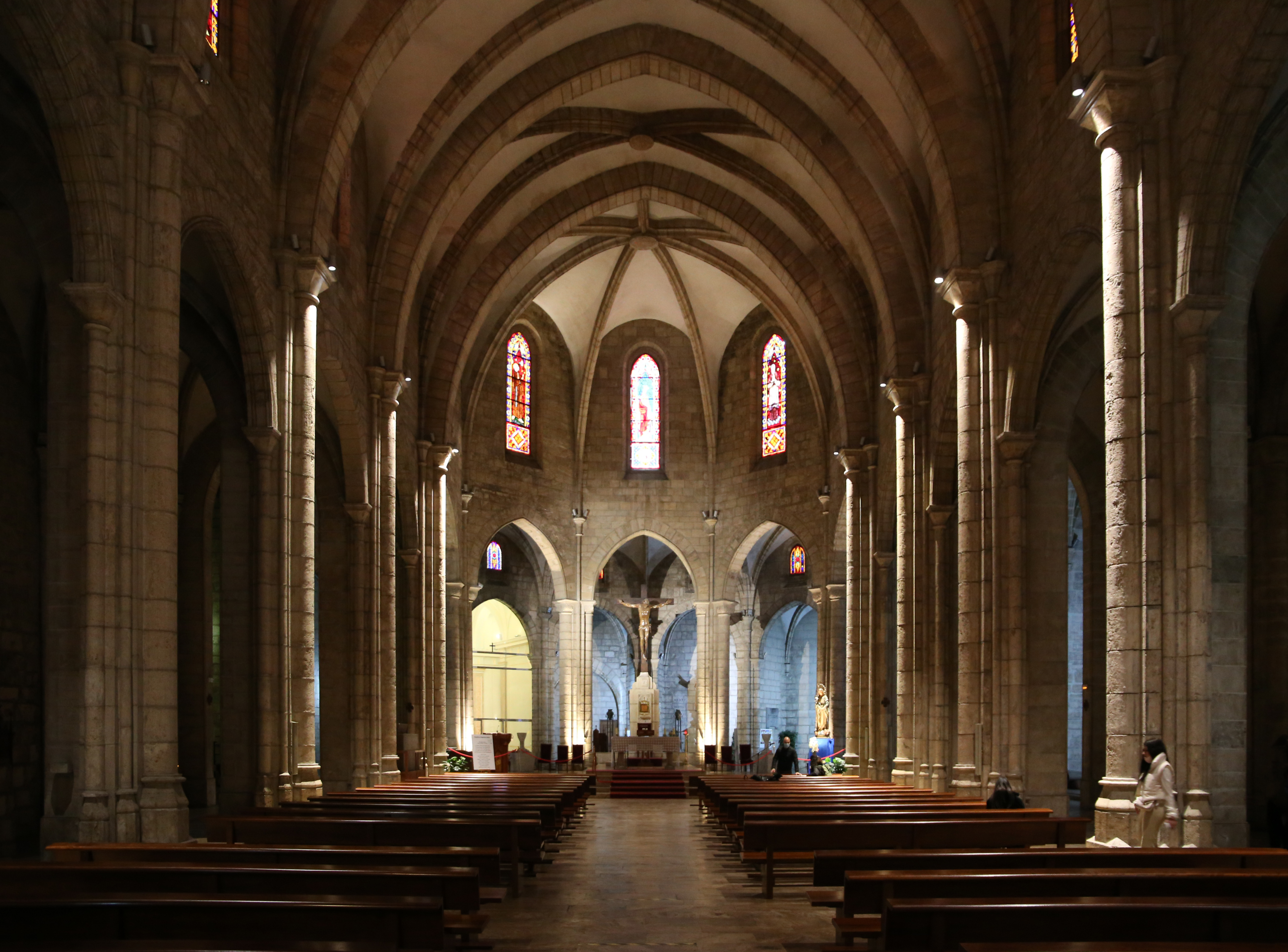
Interior
