= Plaza de la Reina =

- Plaça de la Reina
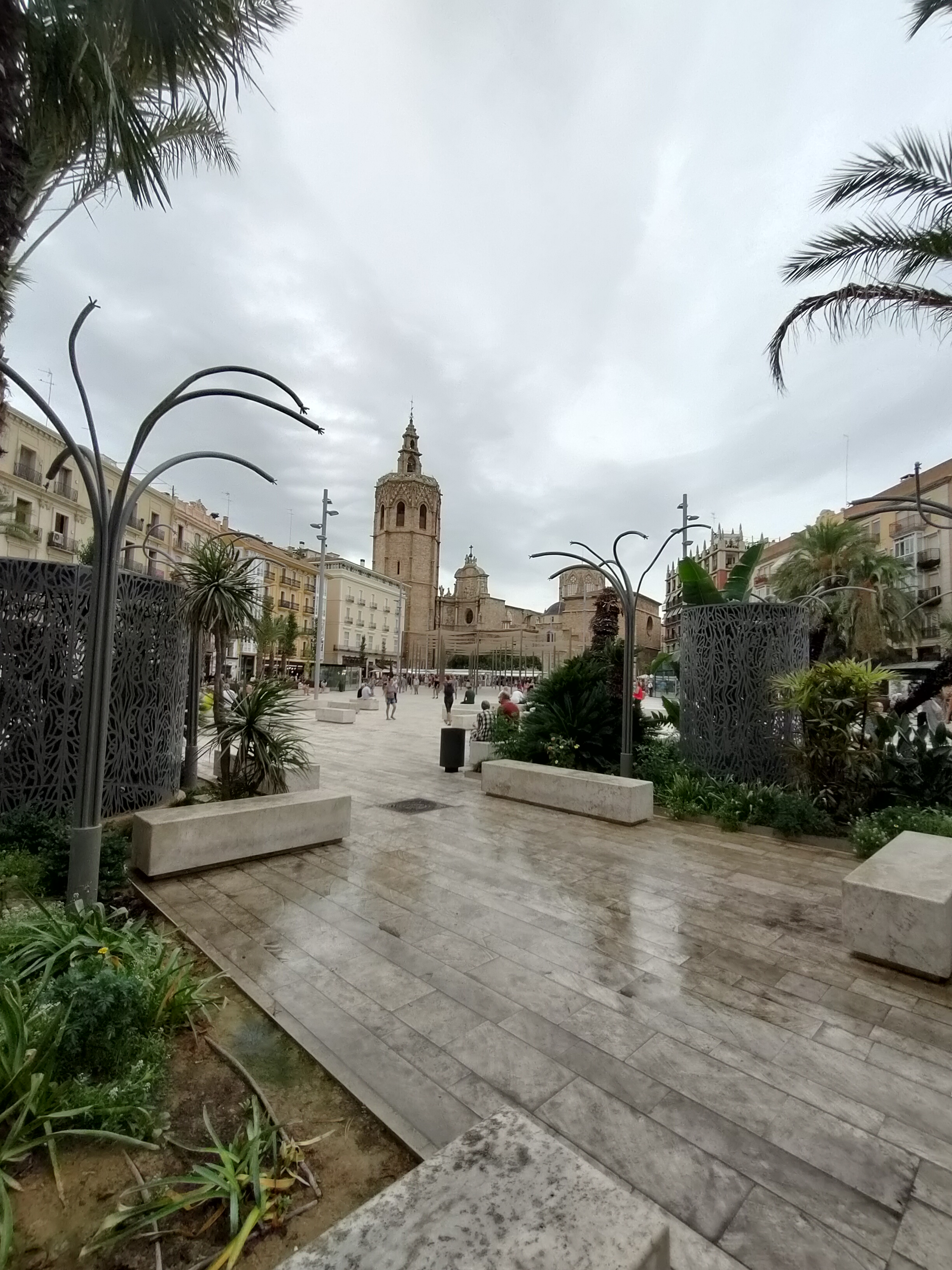
- Plaza de la Reina in Valencia looking toward the Valencia Cathedral in 2022
- Interactive map of the Plaza de la Reina area
- Alternative names: Queen's Square

General information
- Type: Plaza
- Location: València, Valencian Community, Spain, Valencia, Spain
- Coordinates: 39.474513°N 0.375493°W
- Construction started: 1868
- Completed: 1970
- Renovated: 2022
- Governing body: City of Valencia

Other information
- Parking: Underground garage

Plaza de la Reina (Plaça de la Reina in Valencian and Queen's Square in English) is a central plaza in Valencia, Spain. It brings together, among others, Calle de la Paz, Calle del Mar, Calle del Cabilleros, Calle de los Bordadores, Calle de Santa Catalina, and Calle de Santo Vincente Mártir. The plaza includes the baroque door of the Irons, which gives access to the Valencia Cathedral. It is also noteworthy for views of two important bell towers of Valencia, the Santa Catalina and the Miguelete Tower.

== Name of the Plaza ==
Plaza de la Reina is dedicated to Queen Mary of Mercedes of Orléans, first wife of King Alfonso XII, therefore the full name is Plaza de la Reina María de las Mercedes, or Queen Mary of Mercedes Square. It did not always have this name because during the Republic it was called Plaza de la Región Valenciana and for a short period of time Plaza de Zaragoza. This name was used shortly after the disappearance of the old street of Zaragoza due to the demolitions necessary to form the open space that constitutes the square today. As citizens did not get used to the new name and continued to use the previous name "Plaza de la Reina", the city council decided to use the old name again, excluding the original name of Queen Mary of Mercedes.

== History ==
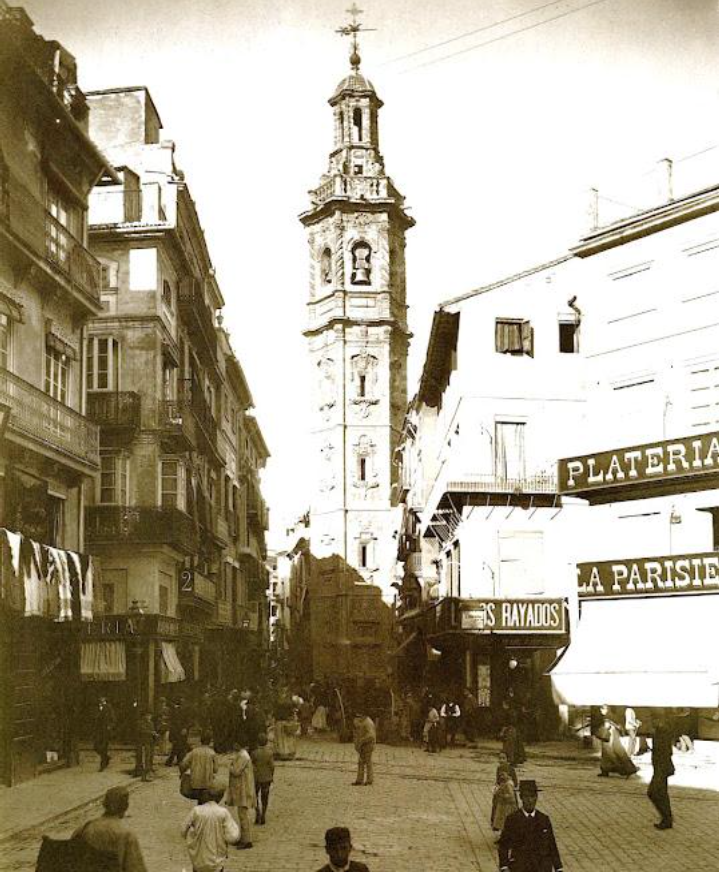
1895 photo of the Plaza de la Reina in Valencia, Spain

The creation of the Plaza de la Reina begins with the Ecclesiastical confiscations of Mendizábal between 1835 and 1837. As a result of this seizure, the monastery of San José and the convent of Santa Tecla are demolished to create an opening for the Calle de la Paz. This results in a modest triangular plaza at the southern end of the current plaza.

Through the 20th century, several plans were drawn up to expand the plaza. In 1911, a plan was proposed by Federico Aymami that would extend a boulevard from the Puente de Real to the northeast corner of the current plaza. This plan was never implemented. In 1928, Javier Goerlich proposed a plan that was similar to Ayamai, but focused on the south end of the current plaza and including the demolition of Santa Catalina Church, but not the belfry. This plan met opposition and again, nothing was done. In 1951, a contest was announced to draw up plans for an expansion and renovation of the plaza. Again, nothing was done, but demolition of buildings continued to open up the space with the final housing blocks demolished in 1963.

In 1968, plans were accepted and work begun to build an underground parking garage in the plaza. This work was carried out by a private company under the direction of City Hall. The new plaza and parking garage were inaugurated in March 1970.

== Renovation ==
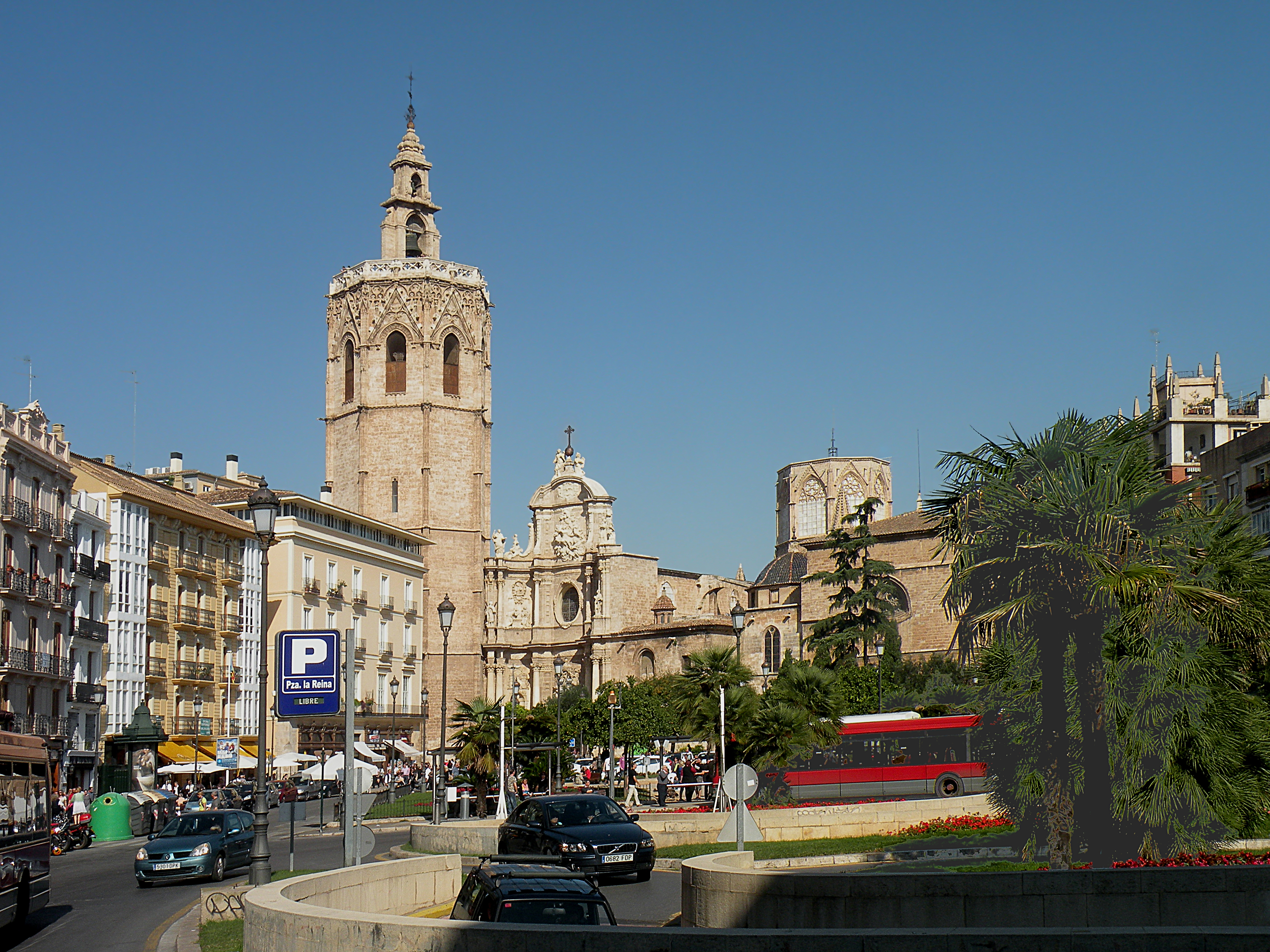
Plaza de la Reina in 2011

In 2000, the College of Architects announced a competition to rebuild the Plaza de la Reina. In 2015, the city announced plans to renovate the parking structure and pedestrianize the plaza using the winning plans of architects Miguel Del Rey, Iñigo Magro and Antonio Gallur. In 2019, the city announced the renovation of the 11,000m^{2} plaza making it completely pedestrianized and the 1970 parking structure will be completely renovated. The parking garage will be adjusted to move the entrance, and it will accommodate 224 cars, 52 motorcycles, electric car charging stations, and bicycle parking. The fully pedestrian plaza will include benches and games as well as awnings to provide shade as the many new trees grow. On 23 October 2020, the Ayuntamiento or City Hall approved a plan and awarded contracts for a €10,782,070 to UTE Escario Arquitectos-Tomás Llavador Arquitectos e Ingenieros-Auravall-Llogaritme and Edifesa will be in charge of project management. The new plaza will be laid with 2,600 tons of stone and reforested with 112 new trees of 30 different species. The work began in April 2021 after some delay. In the process of the work, Visigoth remains were discovered. After some discussion, it was agreed with the Ministry of Culture that full archeological studies will be delayed to allow completion of the plaza renovation.

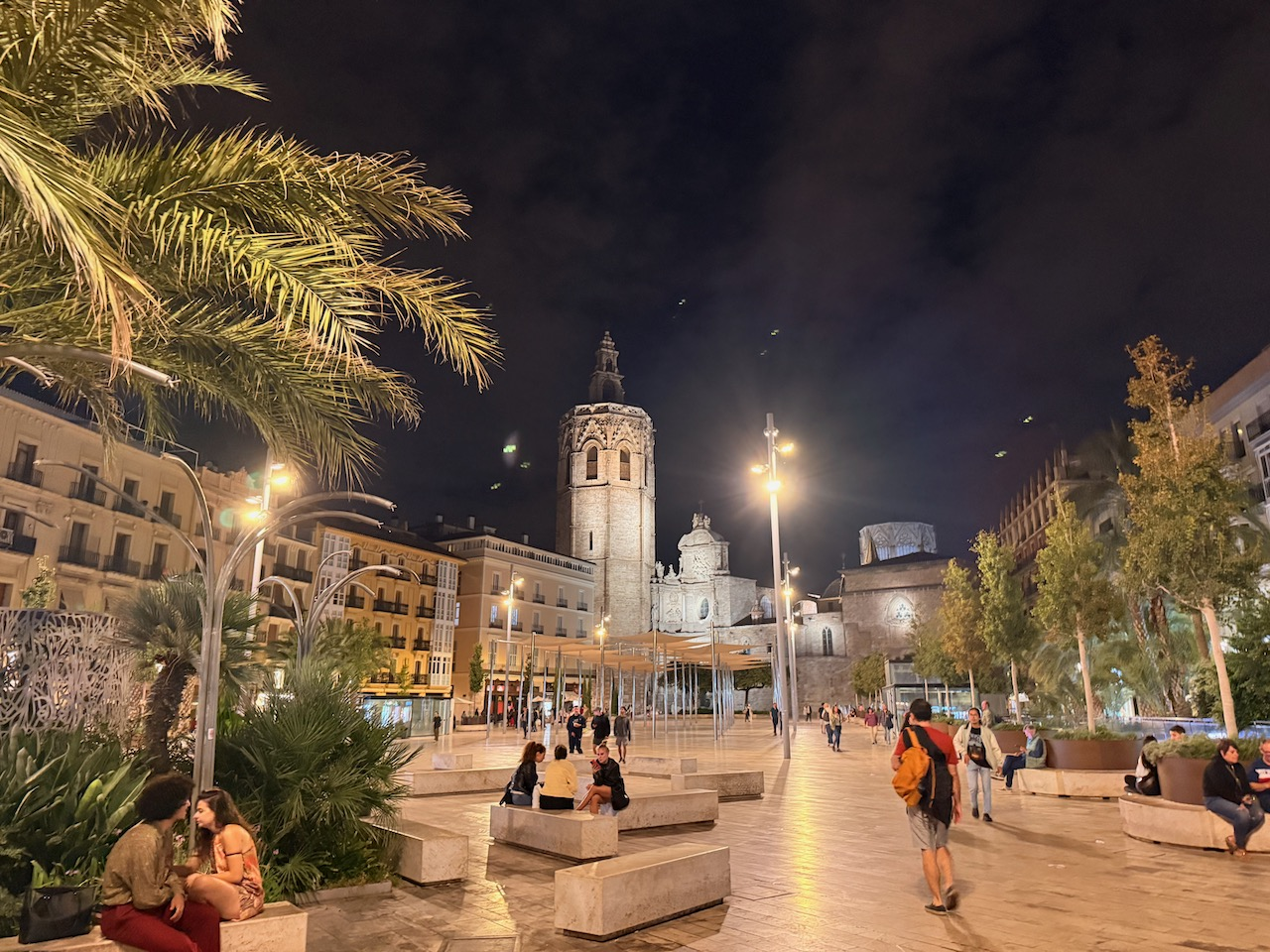
Plaza de la Reina at night with the removable awnings in place

On 28 July 2022, the newly renovated plaza was opened to the public. The completed plaza includes a new public restroom and removable awnings in the summer to supplement the shade provided by the 115 trees. These awnings were also needed as it was not possible to position trees directly over the parking garage. In addition, it is the intention of the city that this be a space for events of various sorts and not simply a park, so the removable awnings will be taken down as needed.

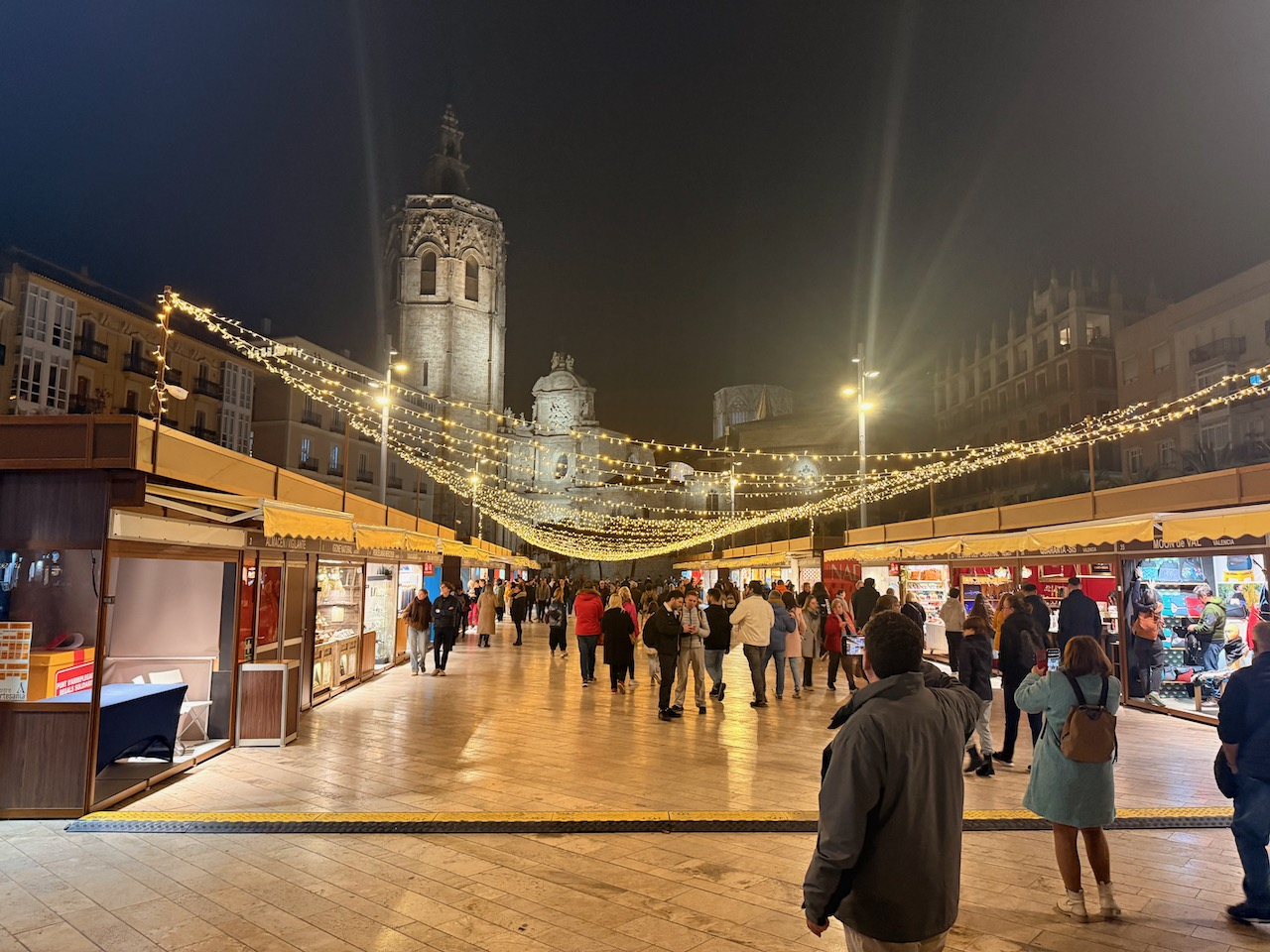
Christmas artisan market in Plaza de la Reina Valencia
