= Castellón–Costa Azahar Airport =

Castellón Airport Aeropuerto de Castellón Aeroport de Castelló
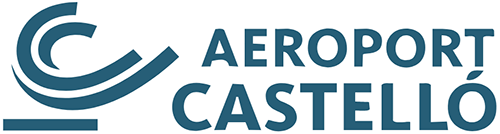

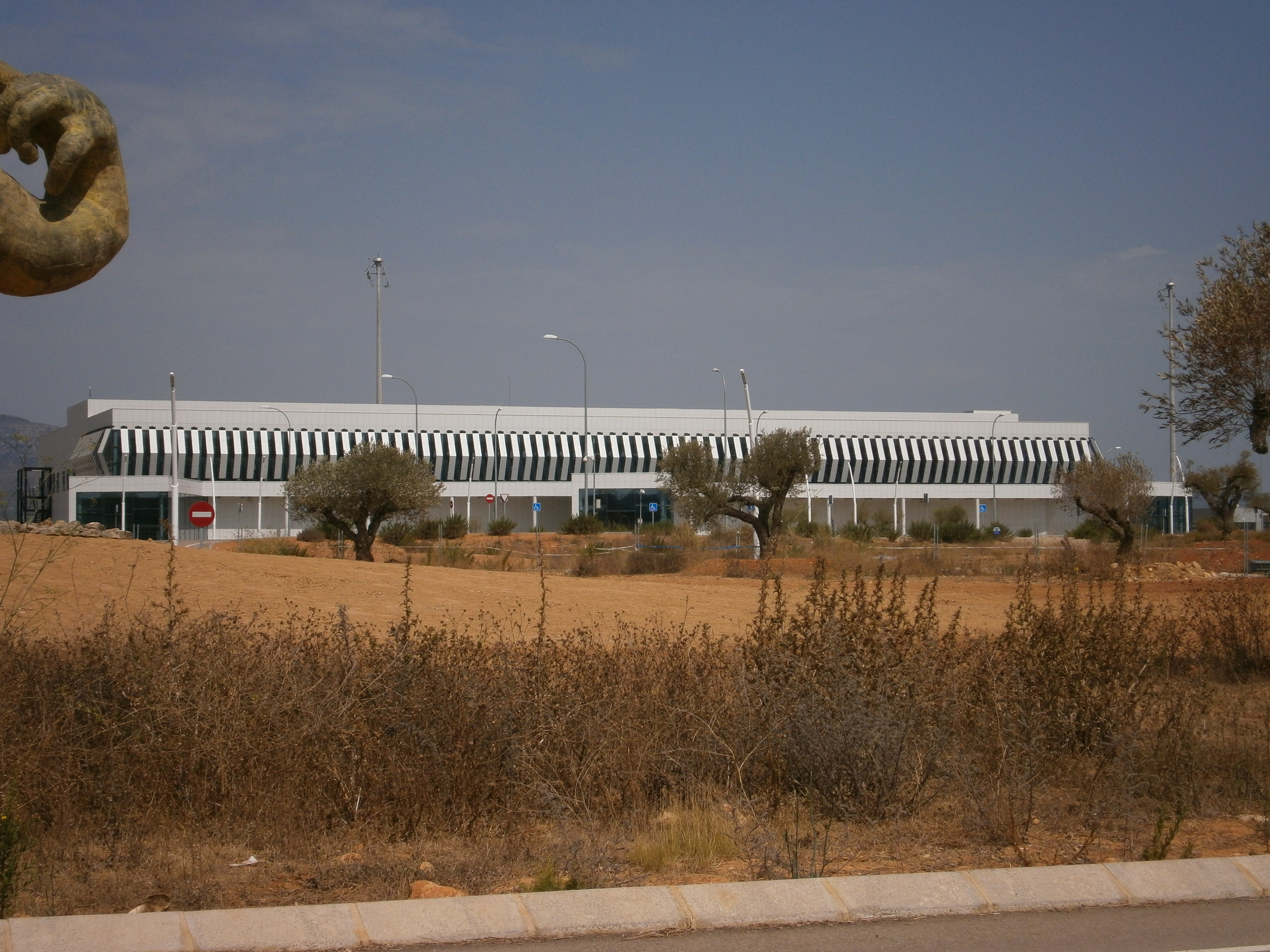
- IATA: CDT; ICAO: LECH; LID: CDT

Summary
- Airport type: Private
- Owner/Operator: SNC-Lavalin
- Serves: Castellón de la Plana
- Location: Vilanova d'Alcolea, Benlloch
- Elevation AMSL: 360 m (1,180 ft)
- Coordinates: 40°12′35″N 0°04′11″E
- Website: Castellón Airport Website

Map
- Location in Spain

Runways
Direction	Length		Surface
Direction	m	ft	Surface
06/24	2,700	8,858	Asphalt

Castellón Airport (Spanish: Aeropuerto de Castellón, Valencian: Aeroport de Castelló), (IATA: CDT, ICAO: LECH) is an airport serving the city of Castellón de la Plana, located near Vilanova d'Alcolea, Benlloc and Cabanes in the Valencian Community, Spain.

== History ==
=== Foundation and construction ===
The airport was officially declared "open" by local authorities in March 2011, shortly before regional elections and as total cost reached €150 million, despite having neither airlines signed up to land there nor government approval to operate. Delayed for several years, commercial flights were due to begin on 1 April 2012, but the first commercial flight to the airport landed on 15 September 2015.

In February 2012, it was reported that modifications would have to be made to the runway before the airport could be brought into use. It was then later reported that the runway was to be dug up entirely.

The airport has become a symbol of the wasteful spending that helped sink Spain deep into the 2008–2012 financial crisis. For instance, the company in charge of running the airport, Aerocas, was found to have spent 26 million euros, a sixth of the cost of the airport, on sponsoring various sports teams in its region. Also, a $375,000, 24-metre-tall statue, often interpreted as a representation of Carlos Fabra, the formerly powerful local politician who was the driving force behind its construction, was erected just outside the airport. Fabra has been under judicial investigation in connection with several cases of corruption and tax evasion, and was sentenced to four years in prison for tax fraud in December 2014. Another point of contention is the fact that the Province of Castellón is within close proximity to two international airports: Valencia and Barcelona.

On 14 January 2014, nearly four years after the formal opening of the airport, a first flight departed from Castellón-Costa Azahar. Air Nostrum charter flight YW2003 carried the Villarreal CF football team, which is sponsored by the airport itself, to San Sebastián for their Copa del Rey match against Real Sociedad.

=== Scheduled operations ===
The first regular scheduled, albeit seasonal, flights from Castellón-Costa Azahar to Bristol and London Stansted, operated by Ryanair, began in September 2015. The European Union has opened a formal investigation into whether both the Canadian company that manages the airport (SNC-Lavalin) and Ryanair are receiving illegal subsidies from the regional government.

During the 2022 Russian invasion of Ukraine, Castellón–Costa Azahar Airport became a storage facility for Ukraine International Airlines fleet of six Boeing 737 aircraft. Also in 2022, a number of airlines scheduled new routes from the airport. These included Wizz Air to Budapest, Ryanair to Dublin and Brussels South Charleroi and Air Nostrum connecting the airport domestically to Madrid.

== Airlines and destinations ==
The following airlines operate regular scheduled and charter flights at Castellón–Costa Azahar Airport:

Airlines	Destinations
Iberia	Madrid; Seasonal: Palma de Mallorca
Ryanair	Charleroi, London–Stansted; Seasonal: Bergamo, Berlin, Bologna, Budapest, Kraków, Manchester, Porto, Weeze
Smartwings	Seasonal charter: Bratislava
Volotea	Seasonal: Asturias, Bilbao
Wizz Air	Bucharest–Otopeni, Cluj-Napoca; Seasonal: Rome–Fiumicino
