= Serra d'En Galceran =

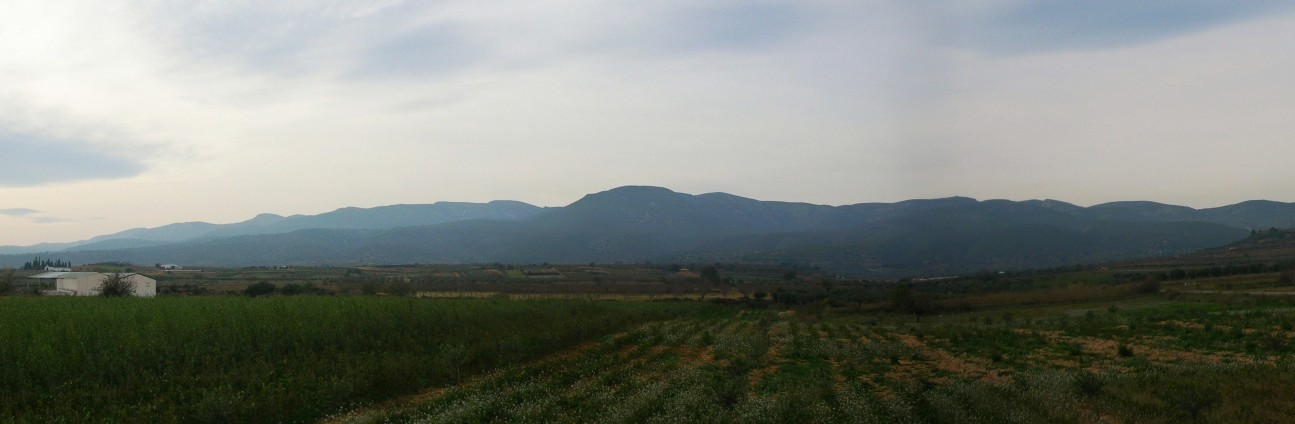
- The Serra d'En Galceran range seen from les Coves de Vinromà

Highest point
- Elevation: 1,078 m (3,537 ft)
- Coordinates: 40°16′57″N 0°00′22″W

Geography
- Location within Spain
- Location: Plana Alta, Alcalatén, Valencian Community
- Parent range: Iberian System, eastern end

Geology
- Mountain type: Limestone

Climbing
- First ascent: Unknown
- Easiest route: From la Serra d'en Galceran or Albocàsser

Serra d'En Galceran (Valencian pronunciation: [ˈsɛra ðeŋ ɡalseˈɾan]; Spanish: Sierra de Engarcerán) is a mountain range of the Valencian Community, Spain.

== Geography ==
The main peaks of the range are the 1,078 m high Tossal de la Vila, Penya Blanca (951 m) and Tossal de la Toiola (939 m). This range is one of the most important areas in Europe where there are still pristine woods and thickets of Phoenician juniper, sometimes mixed with Kermes oak. The Spanish Ibex is abundant in the range.

The towns of la Serra d'en Galceran and la Sarratella are located within the mountain range, the former one giving it its name. Parts of this mountain range fall also within the Albocàsser, les Coves de Vinromà, la Torre d'en Doménec, Vilanova d'Alcolea, Bell-lloc and la Vall d'Alba municipal terms.

== See also ==
- Mountains of the Valencian Community
