= Serratina =

Serratina is a demonym (synonymous with Serrati) for these regions:

- La Serra d'en Galceran
- Serra, Valencia

It's also a genus of bivalve.
