= La Torre d'en Doménec =

- Municipality
- Flag Coat of arms

- Location in Spain
- Coordinates: 40°15′49″N 0°04′12″E
- Country: Spain
- Autonomous community: Valencian Community
- Province: Castellón
- Comarca: Plana Alta
- Judicial district: Castellón de la Plana

Area
  - Total: 3.2 km^{2} (1.2 sq mi)
- Elevation: 306 m (1,004 ft)

Population (2025-01-01)
  - Total: 177
  - Density: 55/km^{2} (140/sq mi)
- Demonym(s): Torretí, torretina
- Time zone: UTC+1 (CET)
  - Summer (DST): UTC+2 (CEST)
- Postal code: 12184
- Official language(s): Valencian

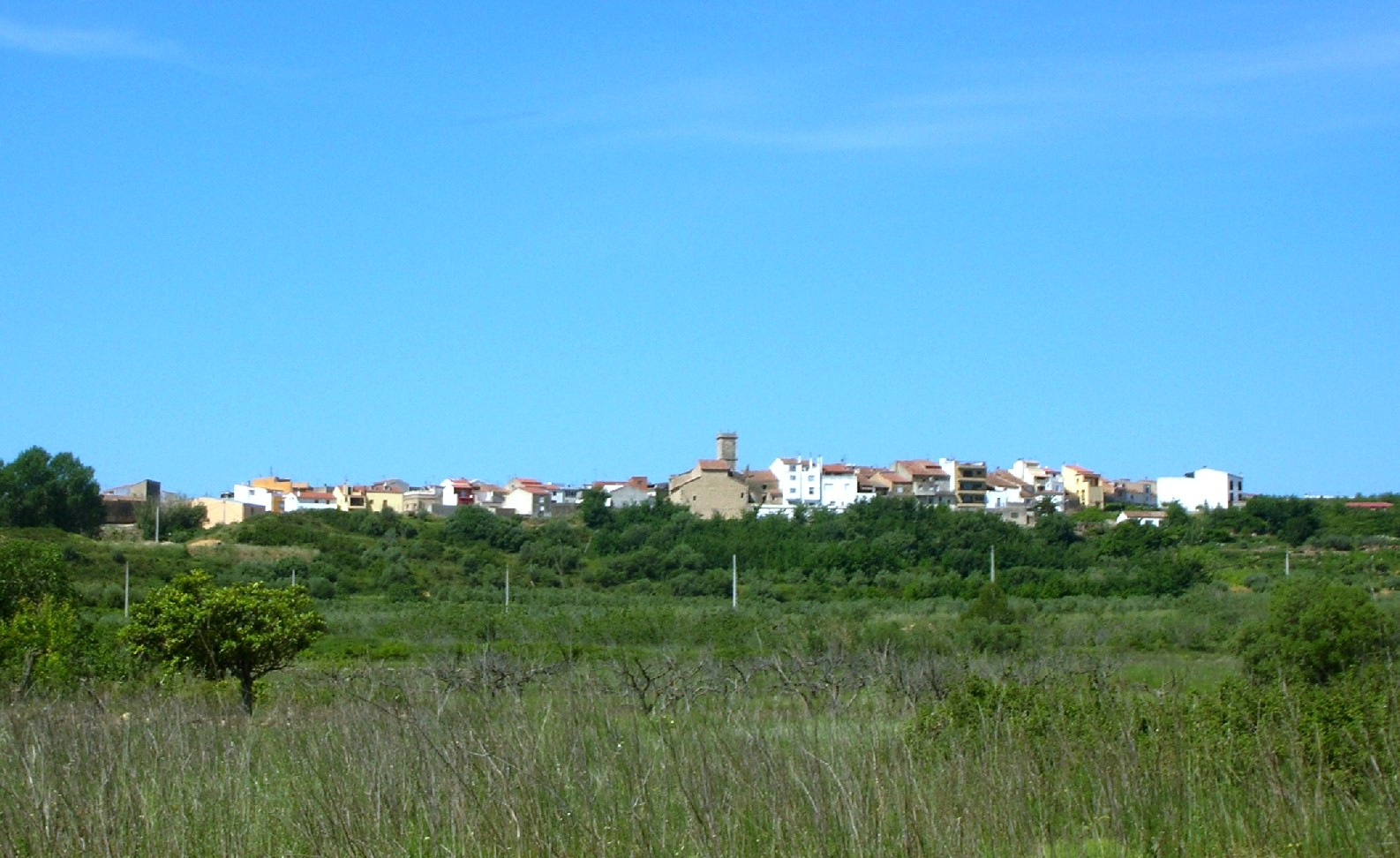
View of La Torre d'en Doménec, also known as la Torre dels Domenges.

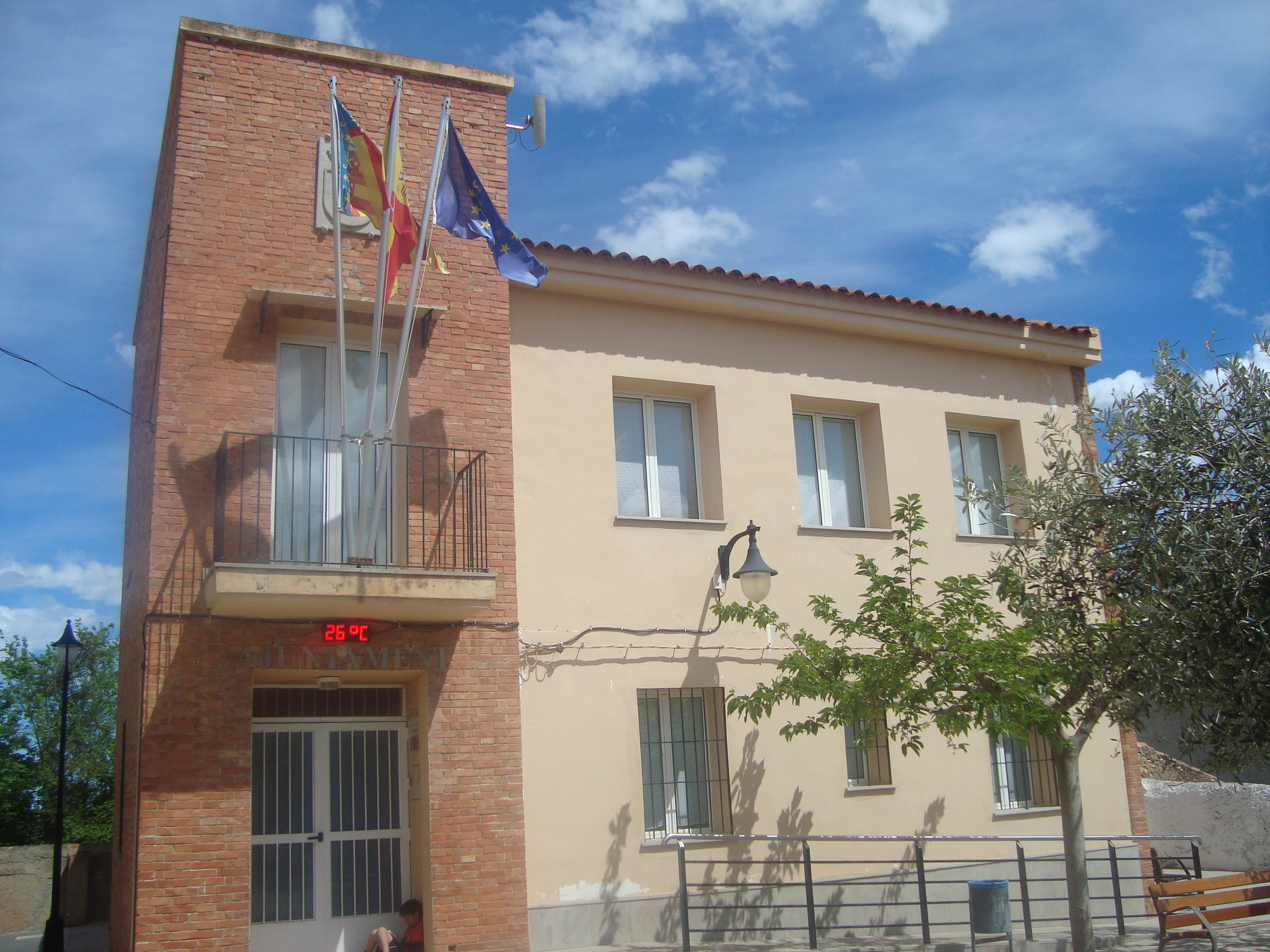
Ayuntamiento de la Torre d'en Doménec (Castellón)

La Torre d'en Doménec or La Torre dels Domenges (Spanish: Torre Endoménech) is a small municipality in the province of Castelló, Valencian Community, Spain. The town is located inland close to the mountain range known as Serra d'en Galceran that protects the town from the strong northern and eastern wind from the ocean.

La Torre d'en Doménec is located about 40 km north of the town of Castelló de la Plana, on the north of the Valencian Community. Historically it used to depend from Les Coves de Vinromà and from the year 1319 onwards it was under the protection of the Knights of Montesa. Until the 19th century La Torre d'en Doménec depended from neighboring Vilanova d'Alcolea parish.
