= Serrati =

serrati or Serrati may refer to:

- Giacinto Menotti Serrati
- José Luís Serrati, founder of Colonizadora Salto del Guairá S.A, which became Salto del Guairá
- Serafino Serrati, a physicist whom the Serratia class (including Serratia marcescens) was named after by Bartolomeo Brizio, who wrote a paper on Kallikrein
- Serra, Valencia or La Serra d'en Galceran demonym (synonymous with Serratina in this usage)
- Serrated denarii (see also: Bigatus)
- serratus (plural)
