= Benlloc =

- Coat of arms

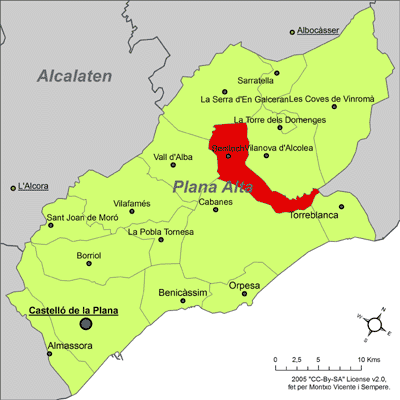
- Location of Benlloc within Plana Alta
- Coordinates: 40°13′N 00°20′W
- Country: Spain
- Autonomous community: Valencian Community
- Province: Castelló
- Comarca: Plana Alta
- Judicial district: Castelló de la Plana

Area
  - Total: 43.5 km^{2} (16.8 sq mi)
- Elevation: 315 m (1,033 ft)

Population (2025-01-01)
  - Total: 1,143
  - Density: 26.3/km^{2} (68.1/sq mi)
- Demonym(s): Belloquí, belloquina
- Time zone: UTC+1 (CET)
  - Summer (DST): UTC+2 (CEST)
- Postal code: 12181
- Official language(s): Valencian

Benlloc is a municipality in the province of Castellón, Valencian Community, Spain, located in the comarca of Plana Alta.

== Geography ==
Benlloc is located in the center of the Pla de l'Arc, itself in the center of Castellón. The town is an example of modern architecture and rural urbanism. It is divided into a modern and a historical section, with these subdivided into quadrants, some containing basic services with others containing plazas, houses and a fortified church. Benlloc shares a border with Alcalà de Xivert, Cabanes, Serra d'En Galceran, Torreblanca, Vall d'Alba, and Vilanova d'Alcolea.

== History ==
The Via Augusta passes through the city, and remains of ancient Roman times are scattered throughout the surrounding region.

== Administration ==
List of mayors from the democratic elections of 1979
Period	Name	Political party
1979-1983		
1983-1987		
1987-1991		
1991-1995		
1995-1999		
1999-2003		
2003-2007	Juan José Edo Gil	PSPV-PSOE
2007-2011		

== Demographics ==
Historical population

Year	Pop.	±% p.a.
1990	1,003	—
1992	940	−3.19%
1994	912	−1.50%

Year	Pop.	±% p.a.
1996	876	−1.99%
1998	863	−0.74%
2000	842	−1.22%

Year	Pop.	±% p.a.
2002	910	+3.96%
2004	860	−2.79%
2005	1,019	+18.49%

== Gallery ==
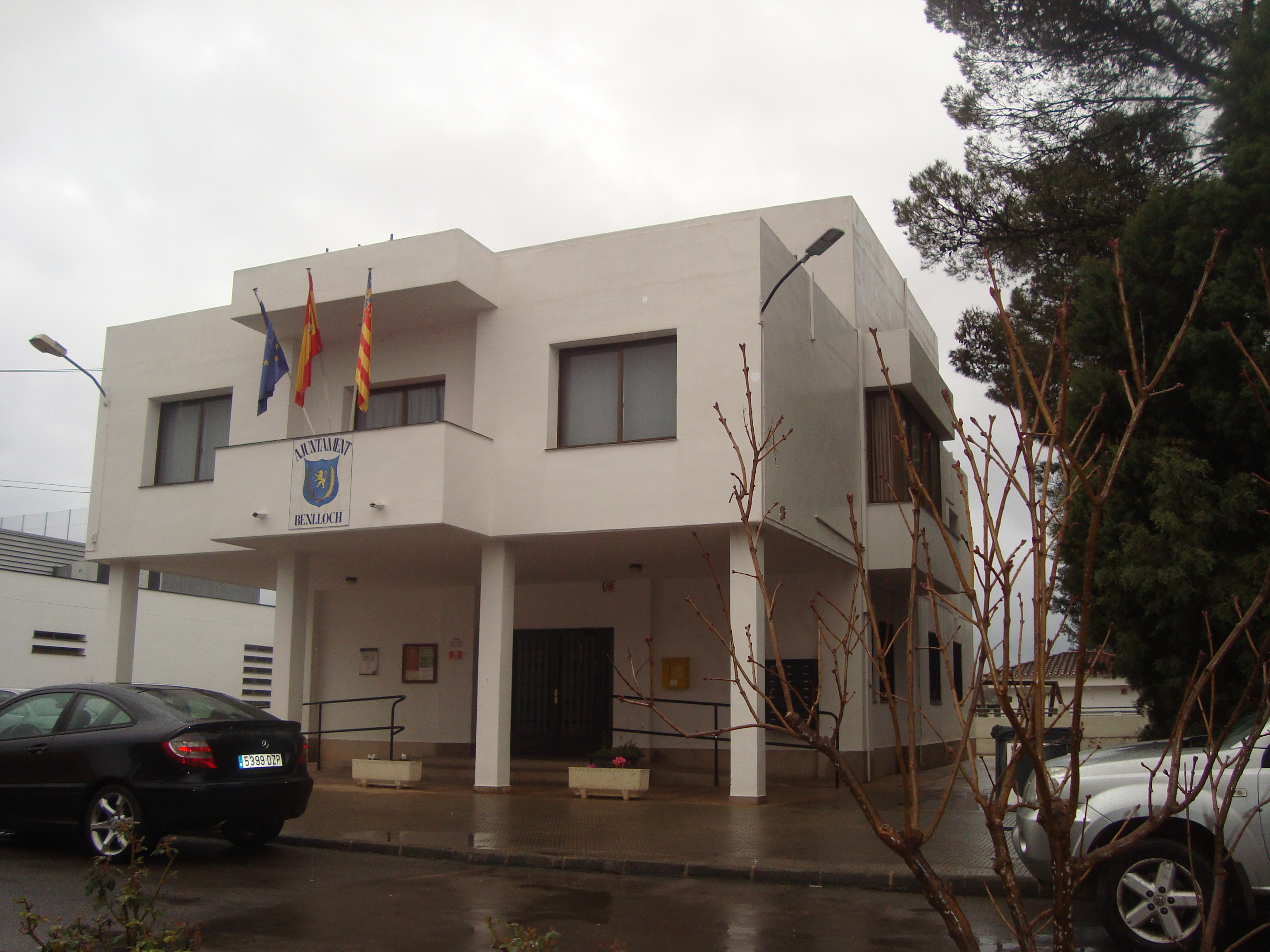
Ayuntamiento de Benlloc

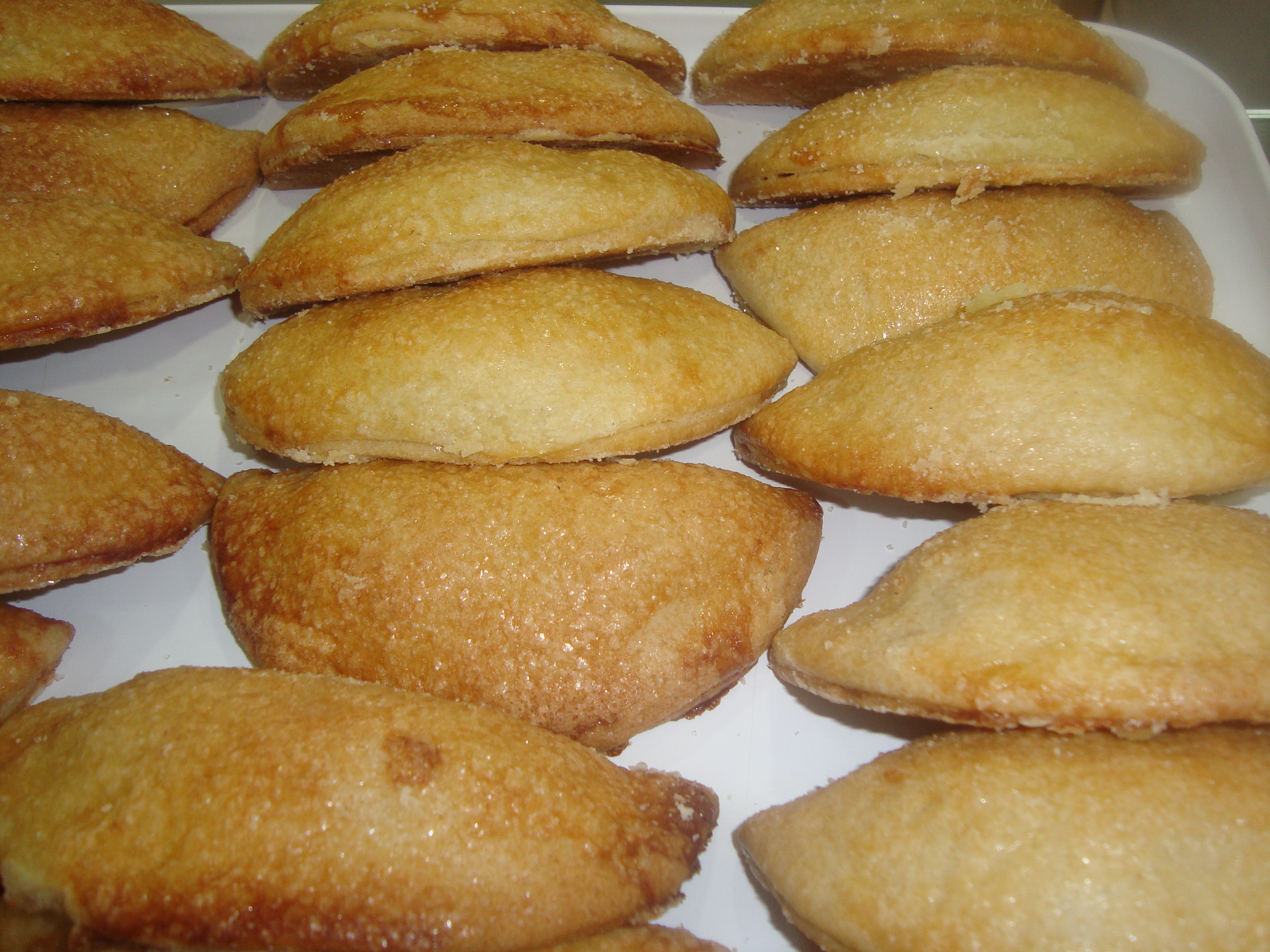
Pastissets de carabassa i mel (Benlloc)

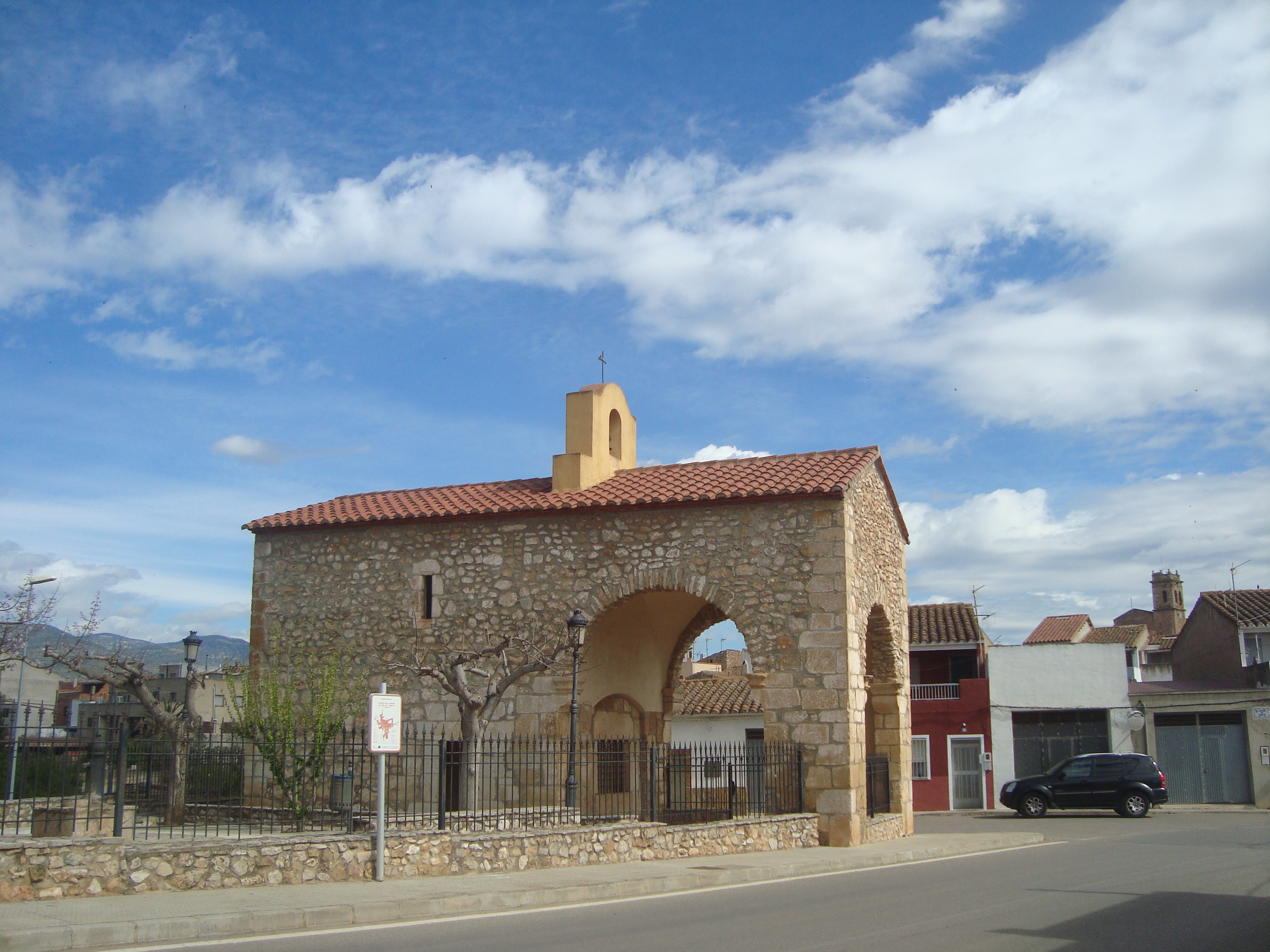
Ermita de Loreto (Benlloc)

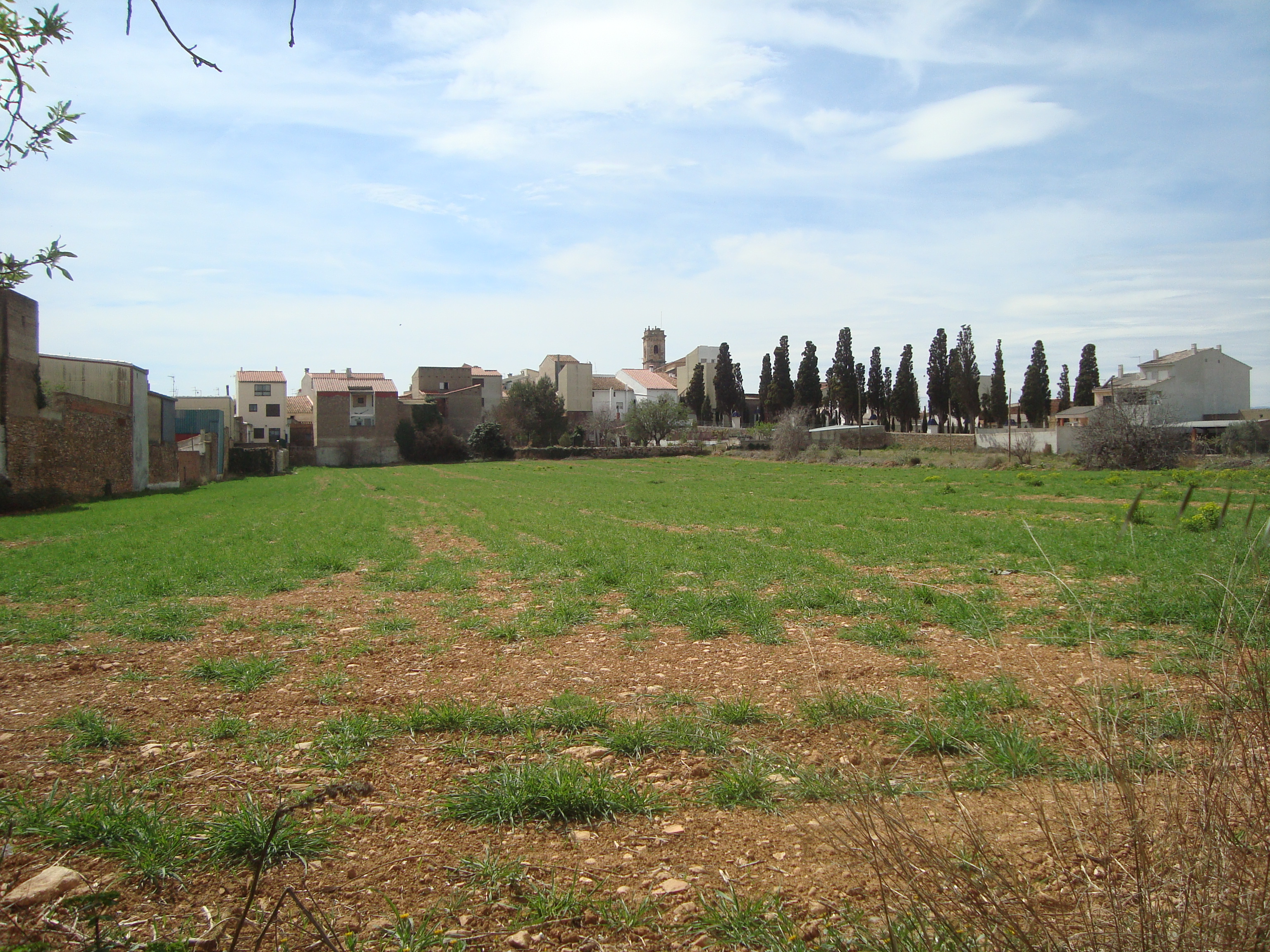
Panorámica de Benlloc (Castellón)

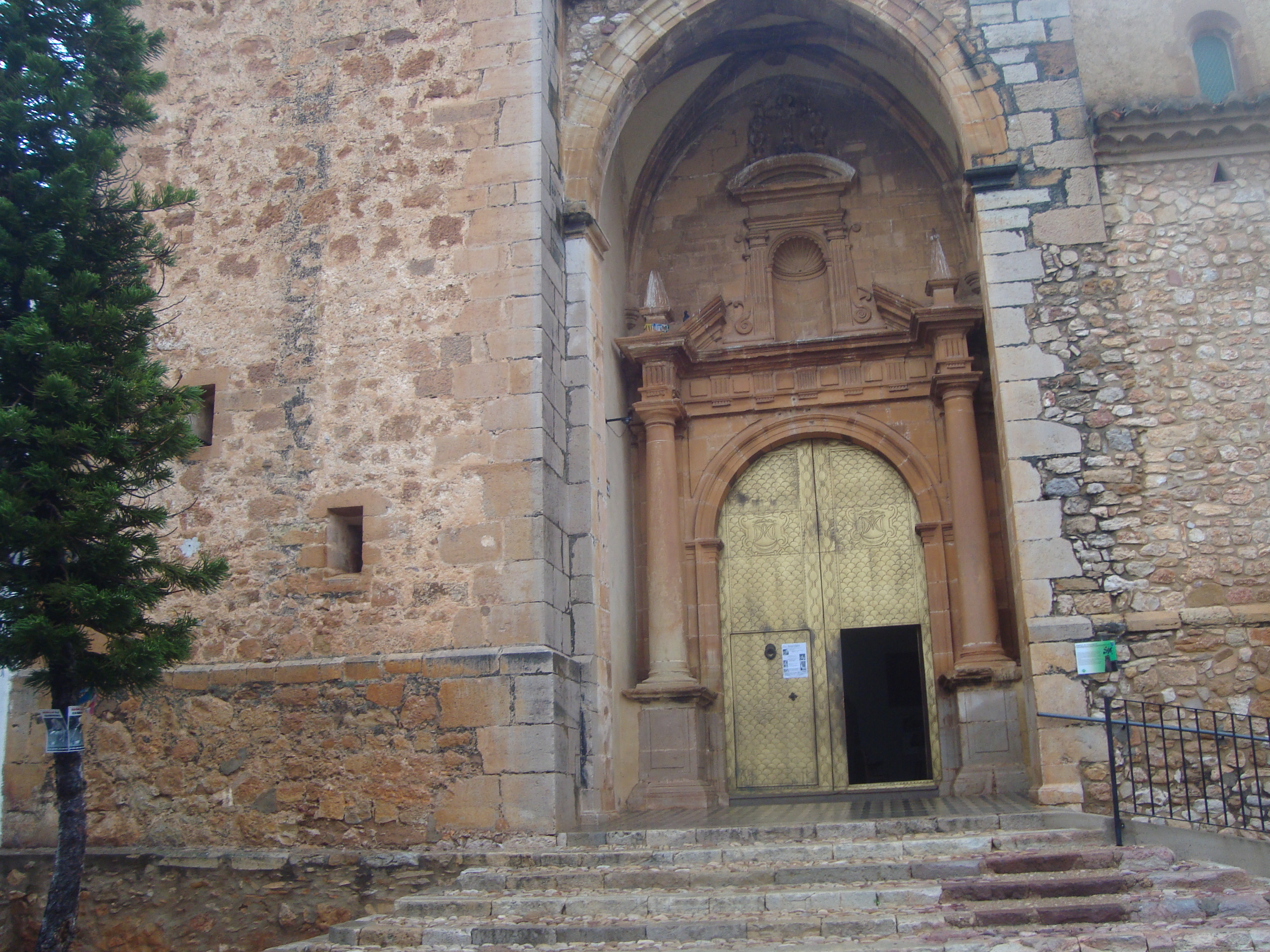
Iglesia Parroquial de la Asunción (Benlloc)

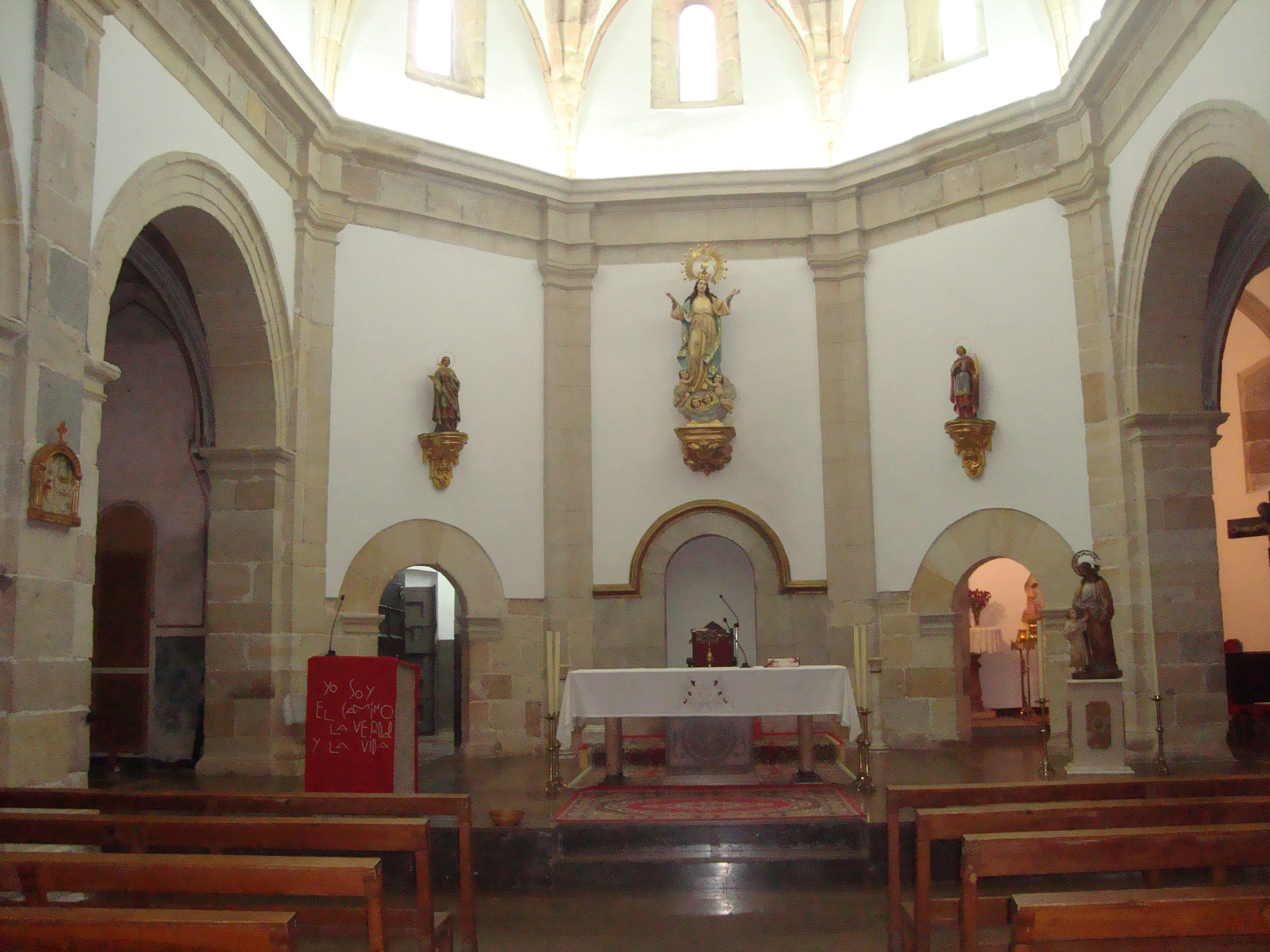
Iglesia Parroquial de la Asunción de Nuestra Señora (Benlloc)

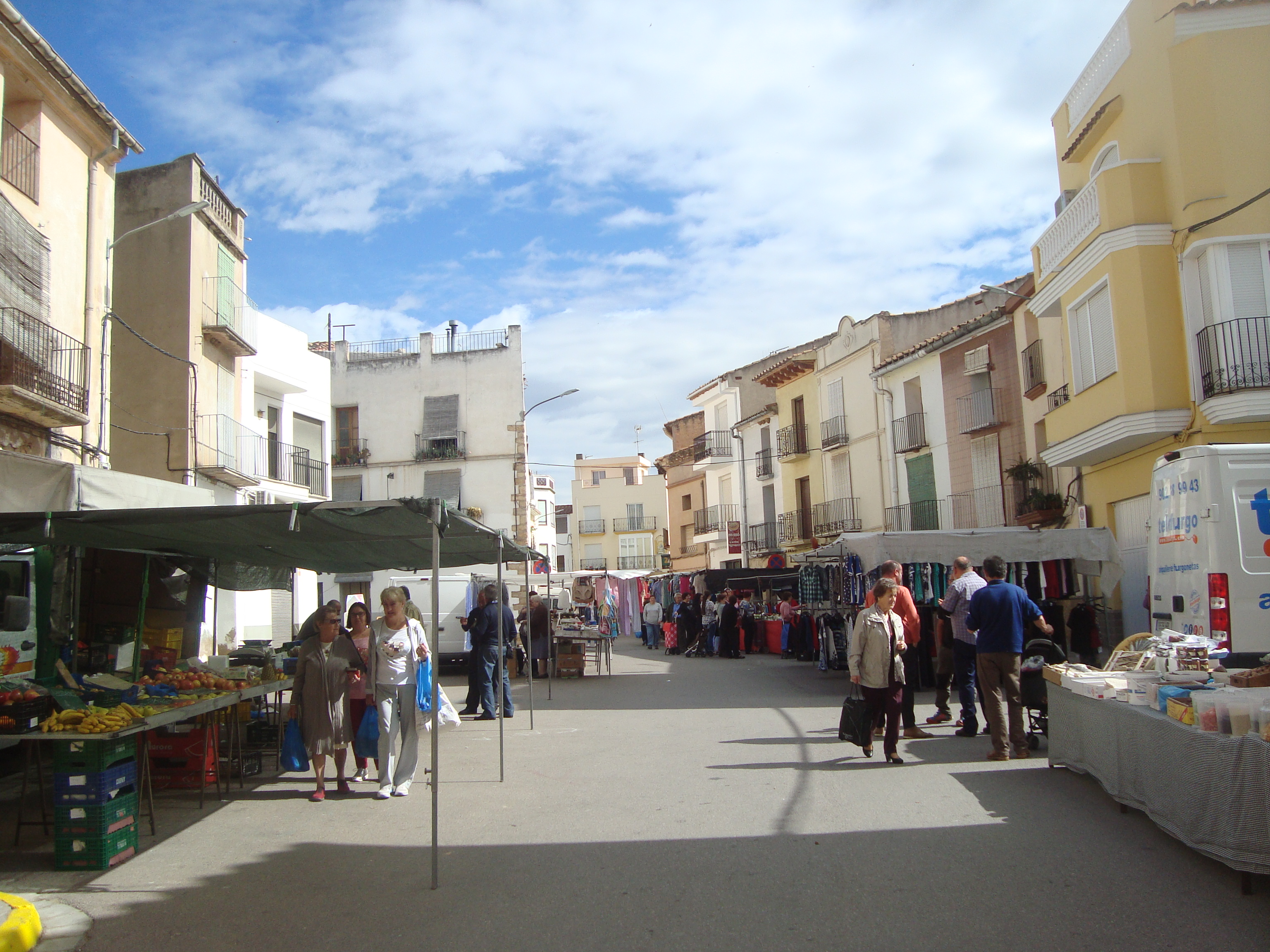
Mercado urbano de los domingos (Benlloc, Castellón)

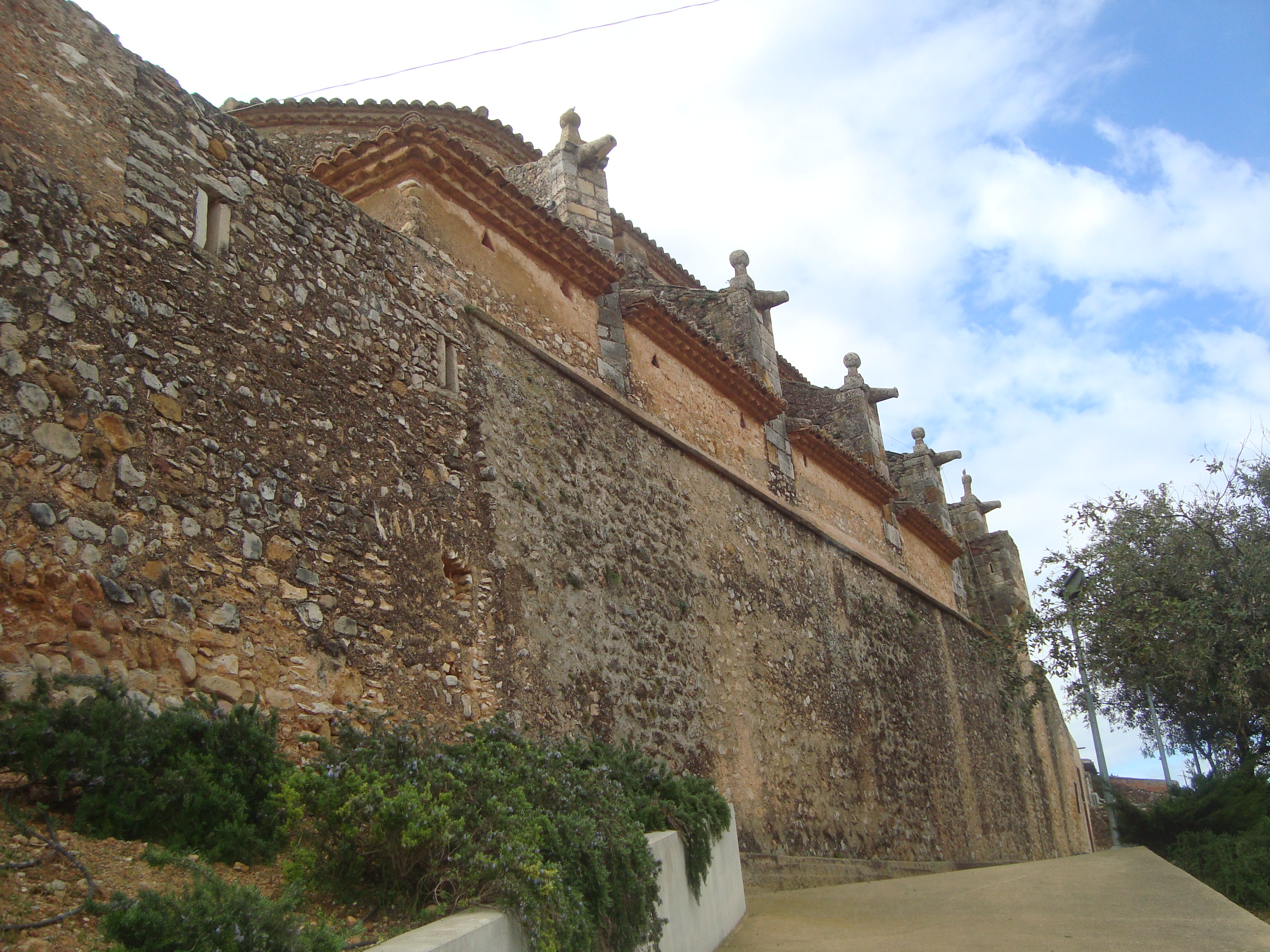
Murallas de Benlloc

== Economy ==
The economy of Benlloc is focused around agricultural production and cattle. Due to mostly dry land in Benlloc, production of fruits and vegetables is made possible due to irrigation techniques. Pig production and poultry are also important industries. The craft industry is centered on turrónes, carpentry, construction and locksmithing.

== Notable people ==
- Ángel Dealbert (born 1983), football player
- José Corbató Chillida (1862-1913), priest and publisher
