= Sant Joan de Moró =

- Municipality and town
- Flag Coat of arms
- Interactive map of Sant Joan de Moró
- Coordinates: 40°3′N 0°8′W
- Country: Spain
- Autonomous community: Valencian Community
- Province: Castellón
- Comarca: Plana Alta

Area
  - Total: 29.1 km^{2} (11.2 sq mi)
- Elevation: 178 m (584 ft)

Population (2025-01-01)
  - Total: 3,695
  - Density: 127/km^{2} (329/sq mi)
- Time zone: UTC+1 (CET)
  - Summer (DST): UTC+2 (CEST)
- Postal code: 12130
- Website: http://www.santjoandemoro.es

Sant Joan de Moró is a municipality located in the province of Castellón, Valencian Community, Spain.

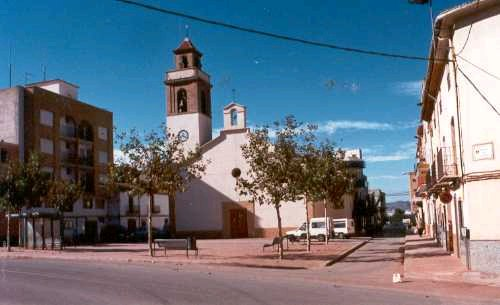
The Parish Church of Sant Joan de Moró, province of Castellón
