= Plana Alta =

Coordinates: 40°0′23.68″N 0°1′38.87″W

- Comarca
- Country: Spain
- Autonomous community: Valencian Community
- Province: Castelló / Castellón
- Capital and largest city: Castelló de la Plana / Castellón de la Plana
- Municipalities: 17 municipalities: Almassora, Benicàssim, Benlloch, Borriol, Cabanes, Castelló de la Plana, Les Coves de Vinromà, Orpesa, La Pobla Tornesa, Sant Joan de Moró, La Serra d'en Galceran, La Torre d'en Doménec, Torreblanca, Vall d'Alba, Vilafamés, Vilanova d'Alcolea

Area
  - Total: 938 km^{2} (362 sq mi)

Population (2019)
  - Total: 252,828
  - Density: 270/km^{2} (698/sq mi)
- Time zone: UTC+1 (CET)
  - Summer (DST): UTC+2 (CEST)

Plana Alta (Valencian: [ˈplana ˈalta]; Spanish: [ˈplana ˈalta]) is a comarca in the province of Castellón in the Valencian Community, Spain. The largest town in the comarca is Castellón de la Plana, which is also the capital and largest town in the province.

== Municipalities ==
The comarca comprises 17 municipalities, listed below with their populations at the 2001 and 2011 Censuses and according to the latest official estimates:

Name	Population (2001)	Population (2011)	Population (2019)
Almassora	17,331	25,522	26,270
Benicàssim	12,456	18,178	18,192
Benlloc	901	1,153	1,033
Borriol	3,812	5,210	5,360
Cabanes	2,473	2,951	2,958
Castellón de la Plana	147,667	176,298	171,728
Les Coves de Vinromà	1,818	1,988	1,823
Oropesa del Mar/Orpesa	4,287	9,733	9,076
La Pobla Tornesa	581	1,142	1,211
Sant Joan de Moró	1,863	2,977	3,159
Sarratella	93	99	101
La Serra d'en Galceran	1,070	1,050	976
Torre d'en Doménec	229	241	180
Torreblanca	4,790	5,726	5,528
Vall d'Alba	1,943	2,939	2,807
Vilafamés	1,514	1,937	1,842
Vilanova d'Alcolea	640	668	584

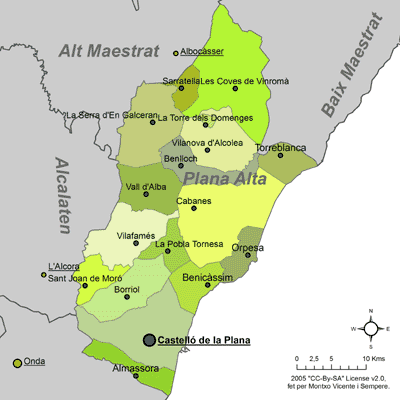
Municipalities of Plana Alta (until 2022)
