= Carlos Fabra Carreras =

Spanish politician

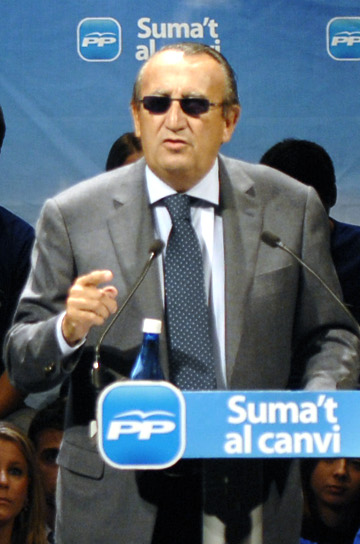

president of the Provincial Council of Castellón
- In office 1995–2011

Personal details
- Born: Carlos Fabra Carreras; 2 August 1945 (age 80) Castellón de la Plana, Spain
- Party: Partido Popular

Carlos Fabra Carreras (born 2 August 1945 in Castellón de la Plana) is a Spanish politician and businessman. He was president of the Provincial Council of Castellón from 1995 to 2011 and one of the leaders of the Partido Popular in the province. He was president of the public company that manages Castellón airport until 22 March 2013, when he resigned after learning that he would be tried in court. He was prosecuted for various offences of influence peddling, bribery and five tax offences, and was sentenced in November 2013 to four years in prison for defrauding the tax authorities of 700,000 euros.

== Biography ==
The Fabra family has had a preponderant presence in the politics of the Province of Castellón since the last third of the 19th century, with seven members of the family (including himself and his father) having presided over the Provincial Council during this period.

His father Carlos Fabra Andrés was one of the founders of the Catholic Youth in Castellón and at the outbreak of the Civil War he enlisted in Franco's army. After the end of the Civil War, he was appointed delegate of ex-combatants in 1939 and four years later he became Provincial Secretary of the National Movement (the political arm of Francoism). Years later, he would hold other posts such as the Presidency of the Provincial Council and the Mayor of Castellón.

== Political career ==
In 1972, he became Secretary of the Provincial Board for Minors, coinciding in the same year with his marriage to María Amparo Fernández Blanes. In 1975, he became Secretary General of the Official Chamber of Commerce, Industry and Navigation of Castellón, and was also appointed Secretary General of the Conference of Spanish-French Chambers COPEF. In 1977 he joined the UCD.

In 1983 he joined Alianza Popular. In 1987 he was appointed president of the Club de Campo (Golf) del Mediterráneo in Borriol, a position he still holds. That same year he was elected councillor in the Castellón Town Council. In 1995 he was proclaimed president of the Provincial Council after the Municipal Elections of the same year, just as his father, grandfather, great-grandfather, his great-grandfather's brothers and his great-great-uncle had been before him.

In July 2008, the Nules Court Number 1 and the Anti-Corruption Prosecutor's Office began an investigation into an alleged fraud against the Tax Agency for money movements between 1999 and 2004, alleging that he had won the lottery on several occasions. The trial should have been held several years earlier, but up to 8 judges have been called to investigate the case and, at the time of the trial, they have all withdrawn. In 2009, the Diputación de Castellón, over which he presided, published a book extolling the figure of Francisco Franco.

In June 2010 he was indicted for the alleged crimes of bribery and influence peddling. In June 2011 he left the presidency of the Diputación de Castellón, after 16 years at its head.

On 17 March 2010, Fabra delegated his functions in the Diputación de Castellón to the first vice-president, Francisco Martínez Capdevila. The day after this resignation, Fabra's son-in-law, Juan José Güemes, presented his "irrevocable" resignation from his post as Minister of Health of the Community of Madrid. Güemes assured that his decision to resign, which came as a surprise to everyone, was for "personal and professional" reasons.

Carlos Fabra was charged with various offences. In December 2010, the Provincial Court of Castellón declared four of the five tax offences for which he was charged to be time-barred, but he was still charged with various offences of influence peddling, bribery and the tax offence for the financial year 1999. In July 2008, the Supreme Court dismissed the appeal filed by Fabra against the judicial investigation. Subsequently, in 2011, the same Supreme Court reviewed the cases that had been dismissed in the 2008 trial and declared itself incompetent to declare the four offences for which Fabra had been acquitted time-barred. In early 2012, it was expected that the cases to be reviewed would be reopened, with the aim of determining responsibilities.

In February 2013, the Supreme Court ordered that Carlos Fabra should also be tried for bribery. In November 2013 he was sentenced to four years in prison for defrauding the tax authorities of 700,000 euros, which led him to finally leave the Partido Popular.

On 1 December 2014, he entered prison, in the Aranjuez penitentiary centre in Madrid. On 18 April 2016, Carlos Fabra was transferred to the third degree by court order. From that day on, he would spend only the nights in Aranjuez prison. In total, he remained in prison for 16 months.

== Reactions ==
The leader of the Popular Party, Mariano Rajoy, described Fabra in 2008 as "an exemplary citizen". The president of the Popular Party of the Valencian Community and of the same community at the time (2010), Francisco Camps noted, after the Gürtel case broke out, the "enormous luck" that Fabra and the province of Castellón had in having him.
