= Vall d'Alba =

- Municipality and town
- Coat of arms
- Interactive map of Vall d'Alba
- Coordinates: 40°10′N 0°2′W
- Country: Spain
- Autonomous community: Valencian Community
- Province: Castellón
- Comarca: Plana Alta

Area
  - Total: 52.9 km^{2} (20.4 sq mi)
- Elevation: 300 m (980 ft)

Population (2025-01-01)
  - Total: 3,218
  - Density: 60.8/km^{2} (158/sq mi)
- Time zone: UTC+1 (CET)
  - Summer (DST): UTC+2 (CEST)
- Postal code: 12194
- Website: http://www.valldalba.es

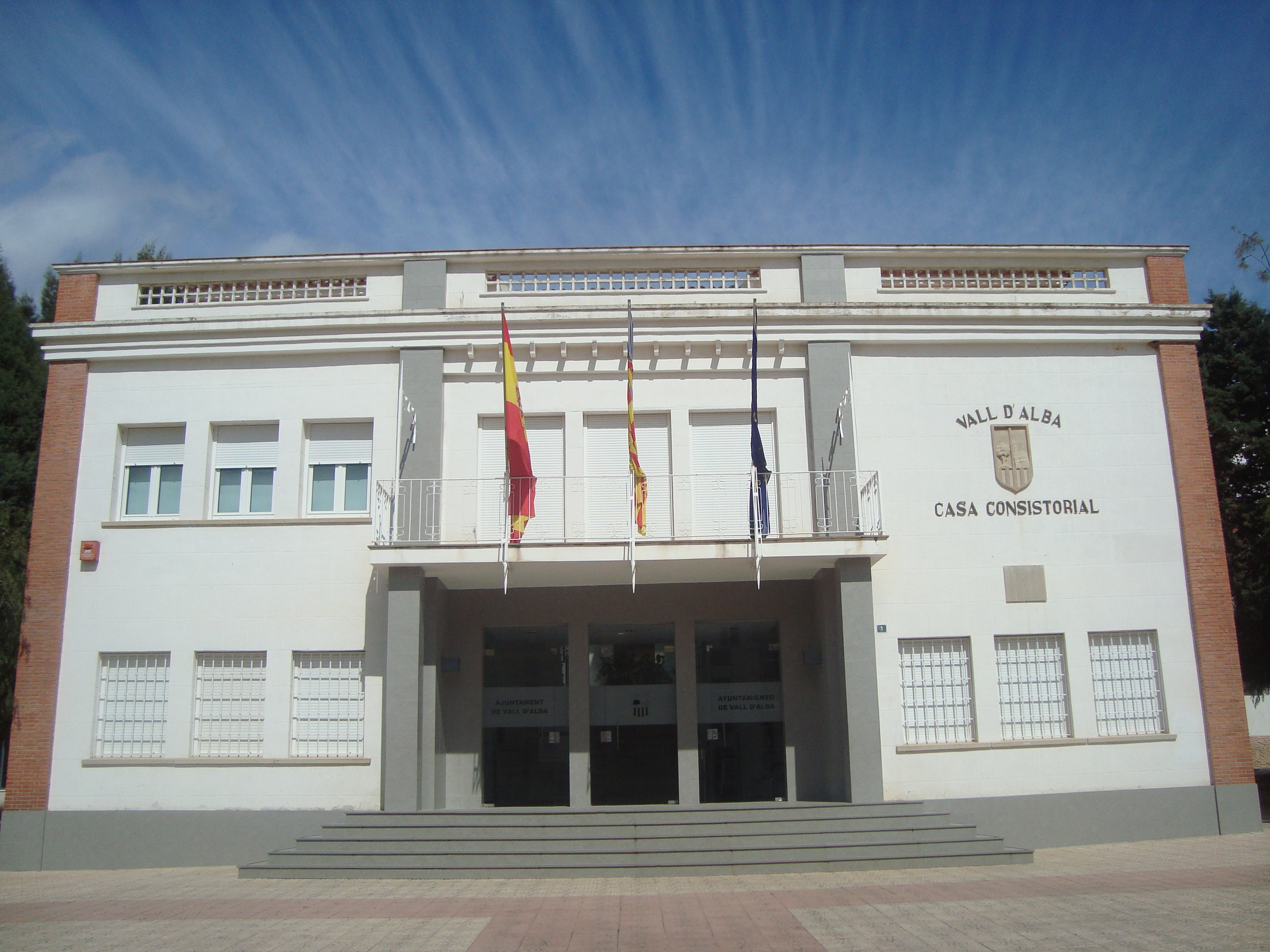
Ayuntamiento de la Vall d'Alba

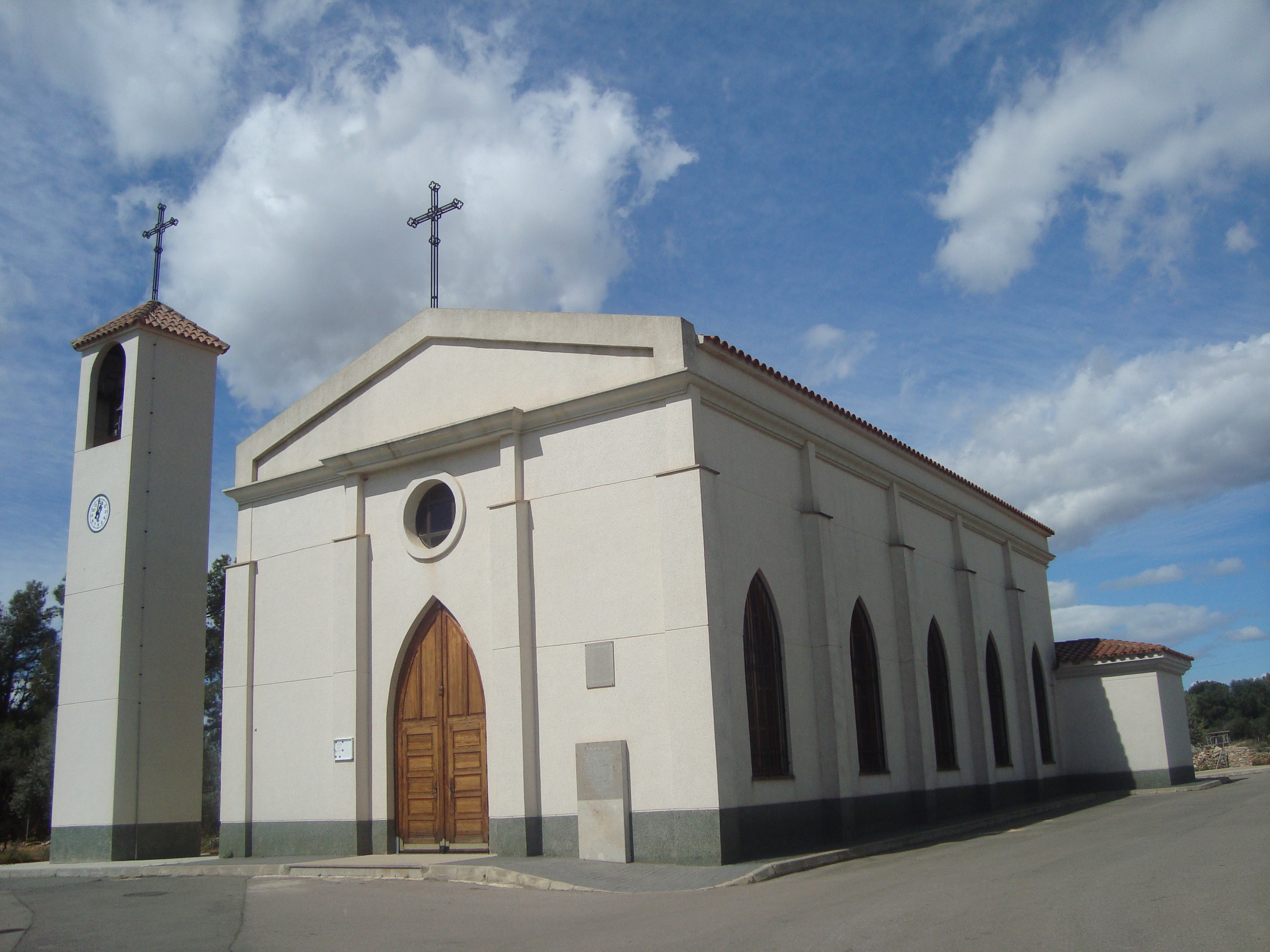
Esglèsia parròquial de l'Assumpció de la Verge (La Pelejaneta, La Vall d'Alba)

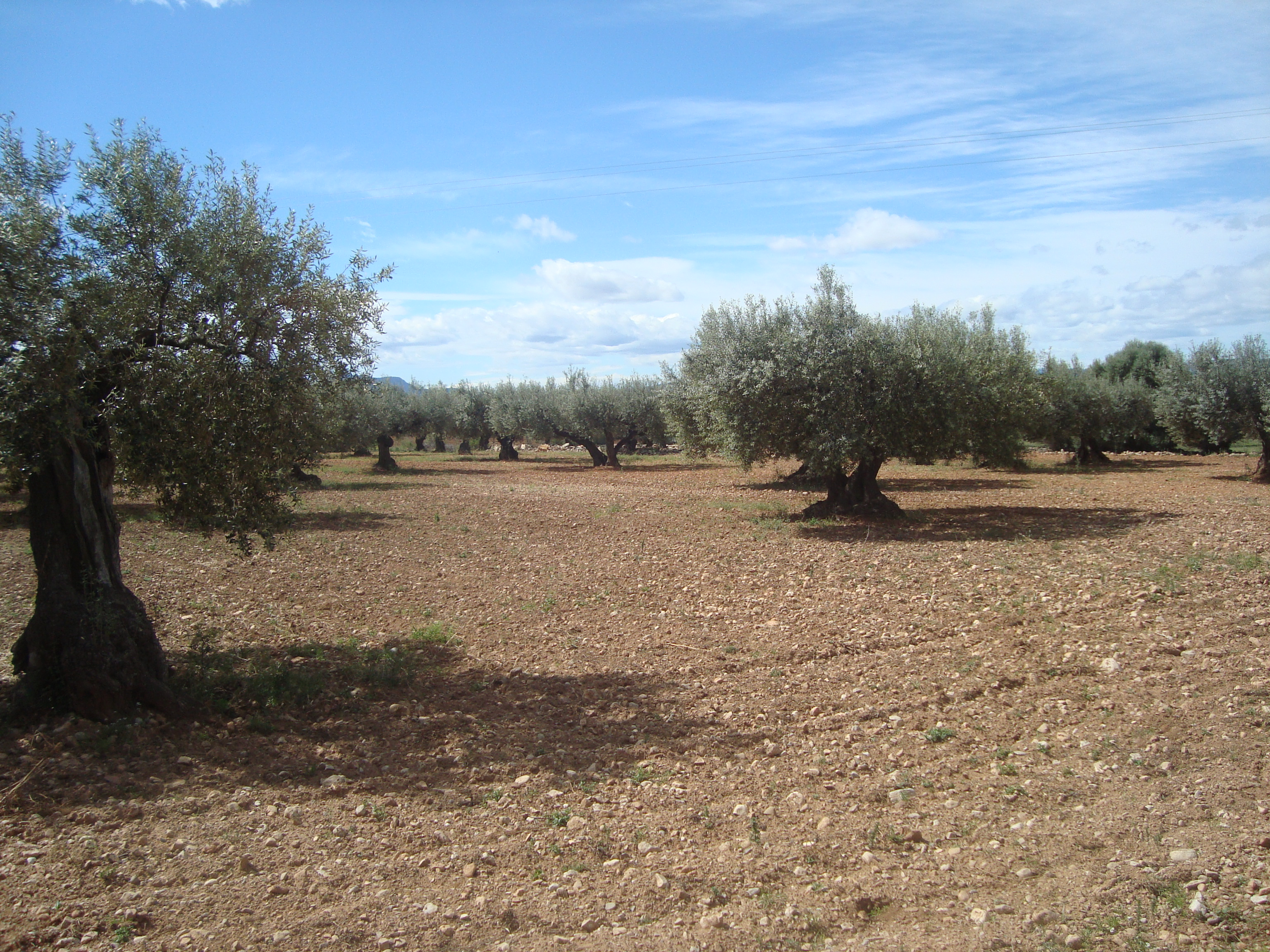
Camp d'oliveres, oliveral (La Vall d'Alba)

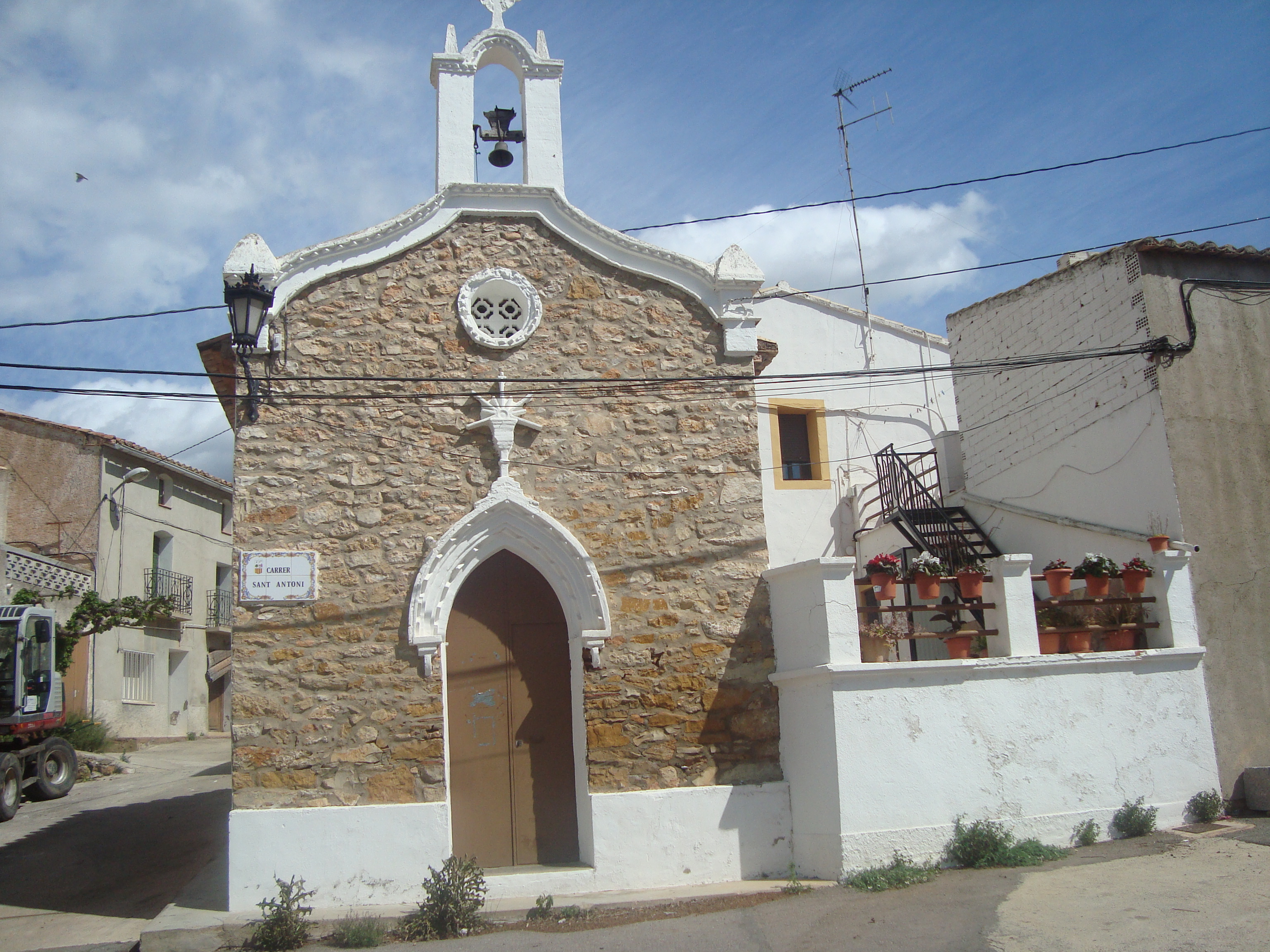
Ermita de Sant Antoni (La Pelejaneta, La Vall d'Alba)

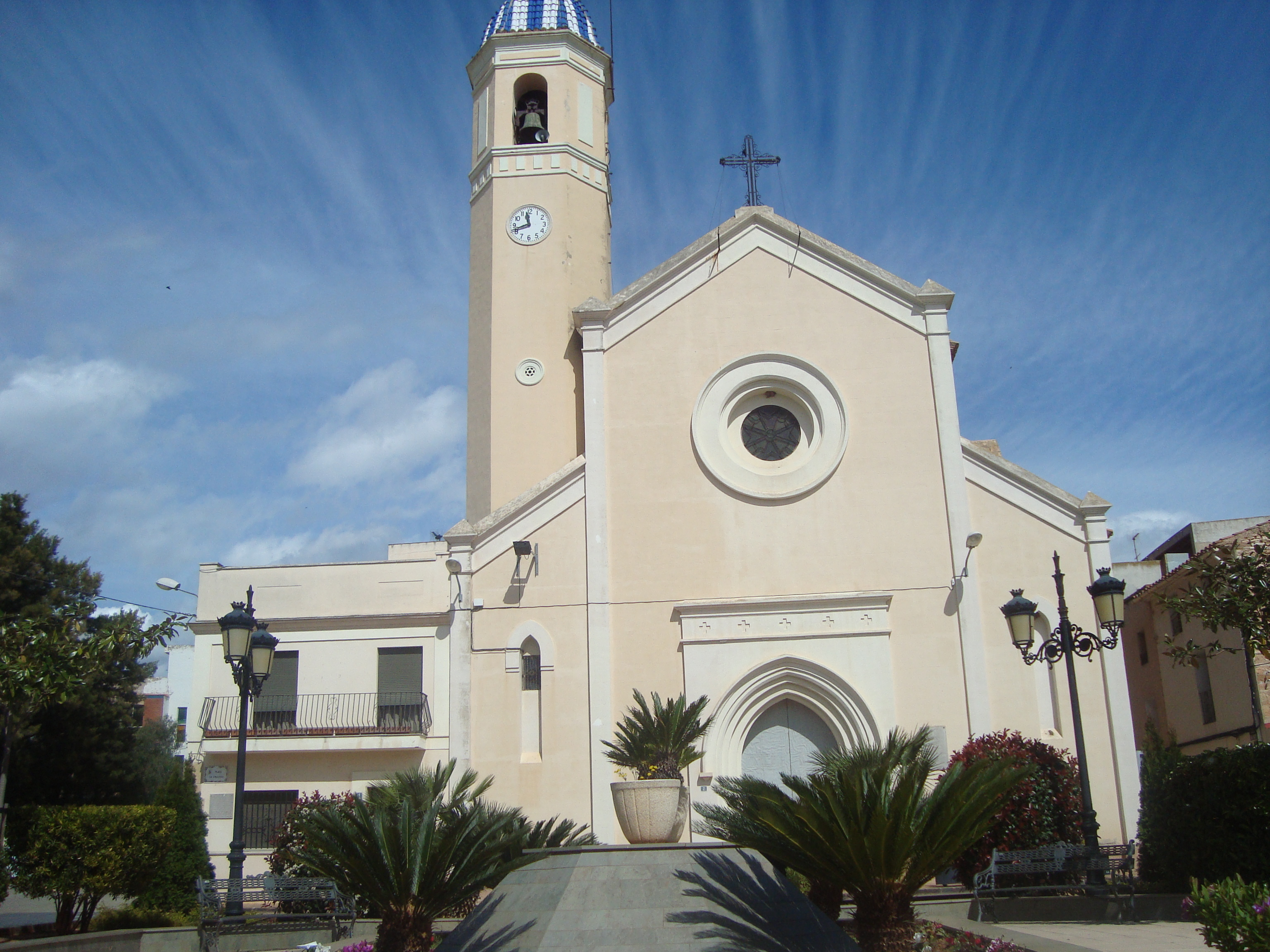
Iglesia parroquial de San Joan Bautista (La Vall d'Alba)

Vall d'Alba is a municipality in the province of Castellón, Valencian Community, Spain.
