= Benlloch =

Benlloch is a Spanish surname. Notable people with the surname include:

- Alfred Benlloch Llorach (1917–2013), Spanish inventor
- Juan Benlloch i Vivó (1864–1926), Spanish Roman Catholic Cardinal
- María Teresa Oller Benlloch (1920–2018), Spanish composer and folklorist

== See also ==
- Benlloc, place in Spain
