= La Serra d'en Galceran =

la Serra d'en Galceran
- Municipality
- Sierra Engarcerán
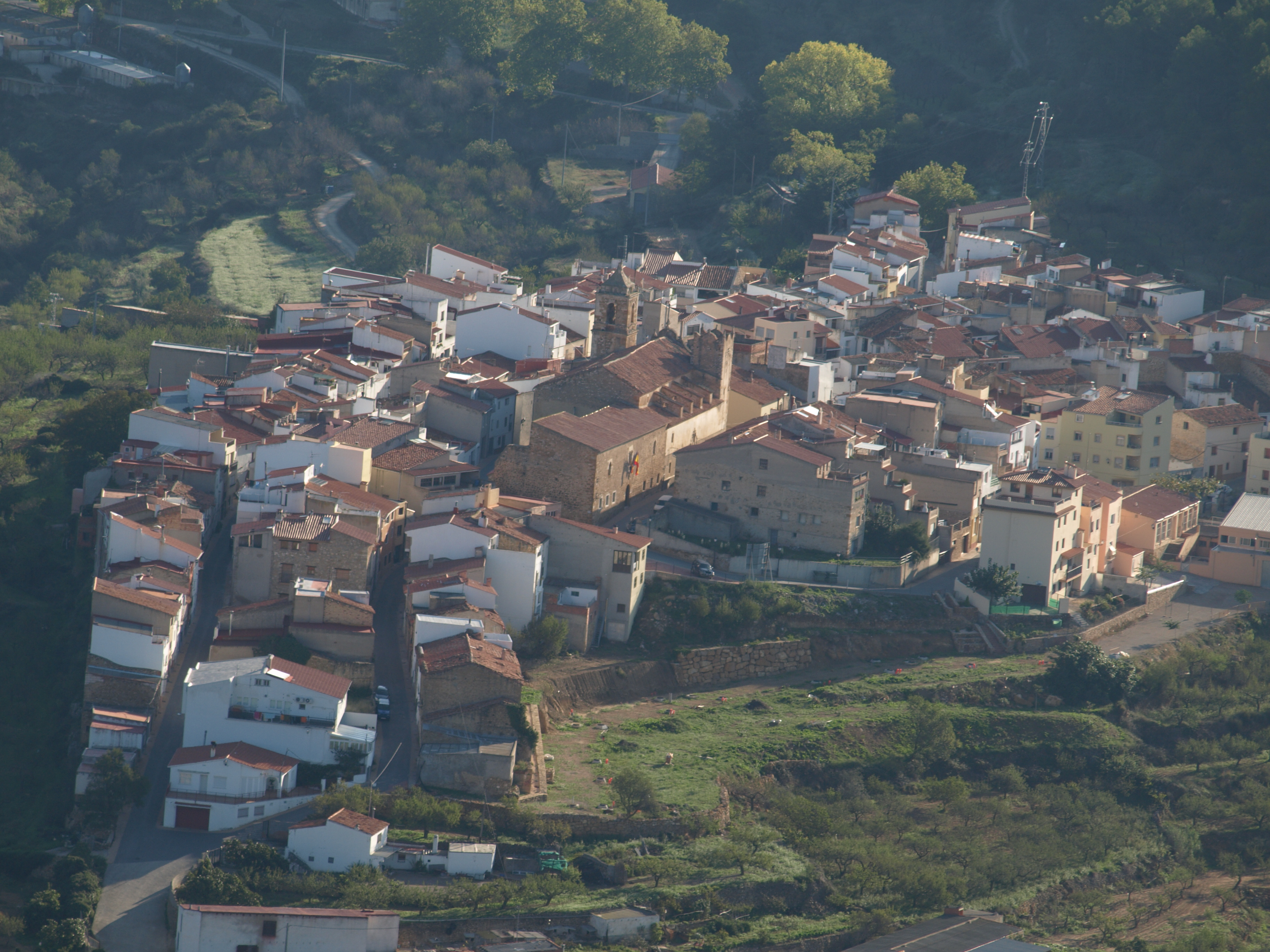

- Coat of arms

- Location in Spain
- Coordinates: 40°16′10″N 0°01′11″W
- Country: Spain
- Autonomous community: Valencian Community
- Province: Castellón
- Comarca: Plana Alta
- Judicial district: Castellón de la Plana

Area
  - Total: 82 km^{2} (32 sq mi)
- Elevation: 748 m (2,454 ft)

Population (2025-01-01)
  - Total: 1,039
  - Density: 13/km^{2} (33/sq mi)
- Demonym(s): Serratí, serratina
- Time zone: UTC+1 (CET)
  - Summer (DST): UTC+2 (CEST)
- Postal code: 12105
- Official language(s): Valencian

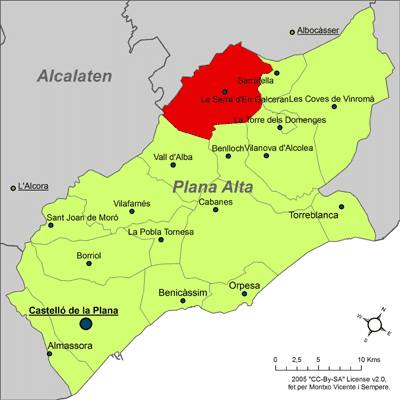
Location of la Serra d'en Galceran in the Plana Alta comarca.

La Serra d'en Galceran (Valencian pronunciation: [la ˈsɛra ðeŋ ɡalseˈɾan], Spanish: Sierra Engarcerán) is a small municipality in the province of Castelló, Valencian Community, Spain. It is located inland surrounded by the mountain range known as Serra d'en Galceran. The town gives its name to the range.

La Serra d'en Galceran is located about 50 km north of the town of Castelló de la Plana, on the north of the Valencian Community.

== History ==
It is not known what was the name of the range or the village in ancient times. There are ancient Iberian settlements in an area known as El Castellàs, as well as some cave paintings that have been declared a World Heritage Site by UNESCO. During the Muslim times there was a castle, as well as some agricultural settlements, in the area.

Historically the first documents are from the years 1213 and 1238 and they tell that James I of Aragon gave the territory, just conquered from the saracens, to nobleman Pere Valimanya. Thus, in 1364 the place appears with the name Serra de Valimanya. Following this, the territory was acquired by a nobleman of the Galceran family; hence the present name.

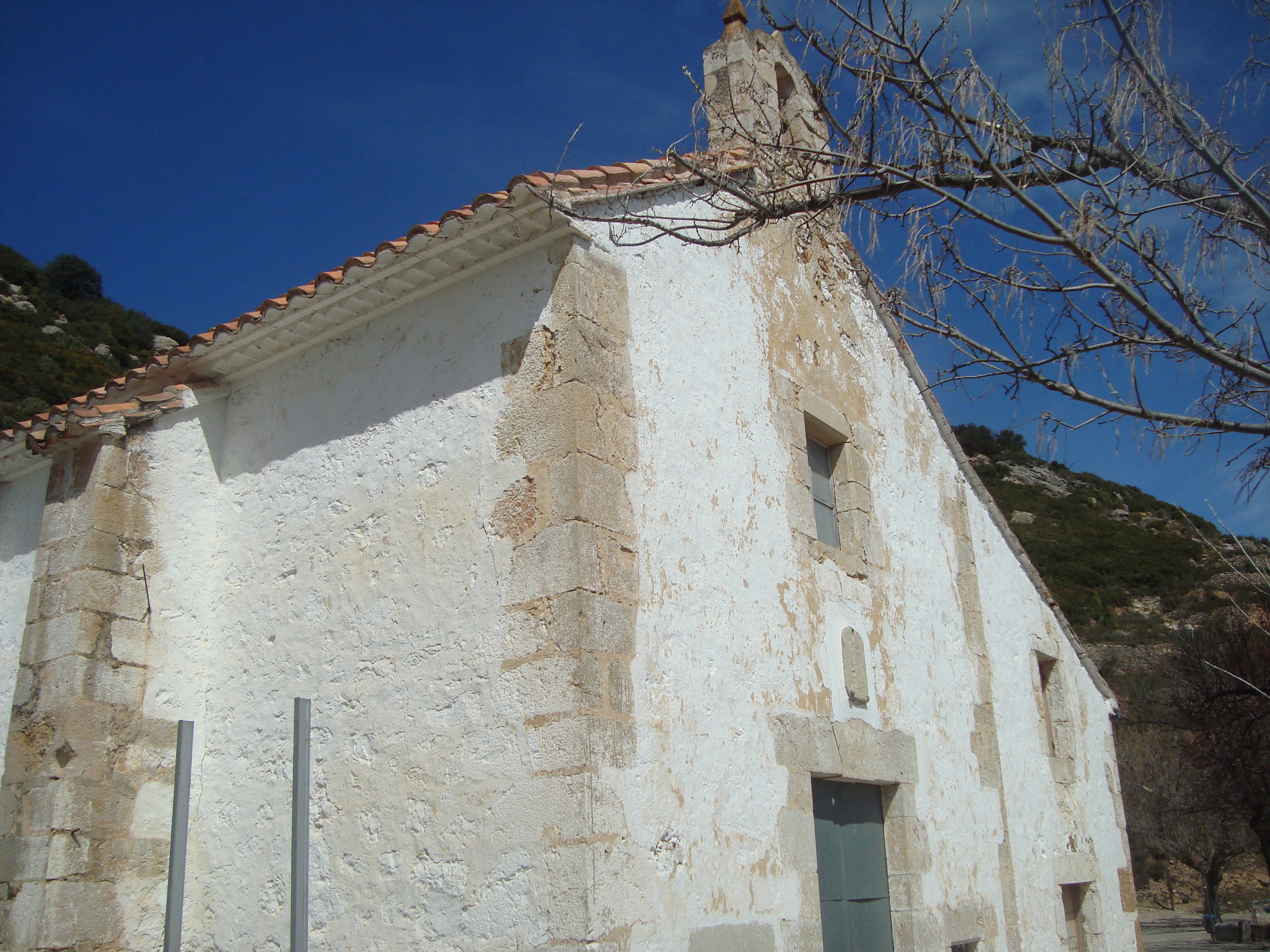
Ermita de Sant Miquel (la Serra d'en Galceran)

Nicolau de Casalduch, known as "l'antic" or "el vinculador" gave the municipal charter to the town on 6 December 1512.

=== Villages ===
- La Serra d'en Galceran
- El Brusalet
- Les Deveses
- Els Ivarsos
- La Marina
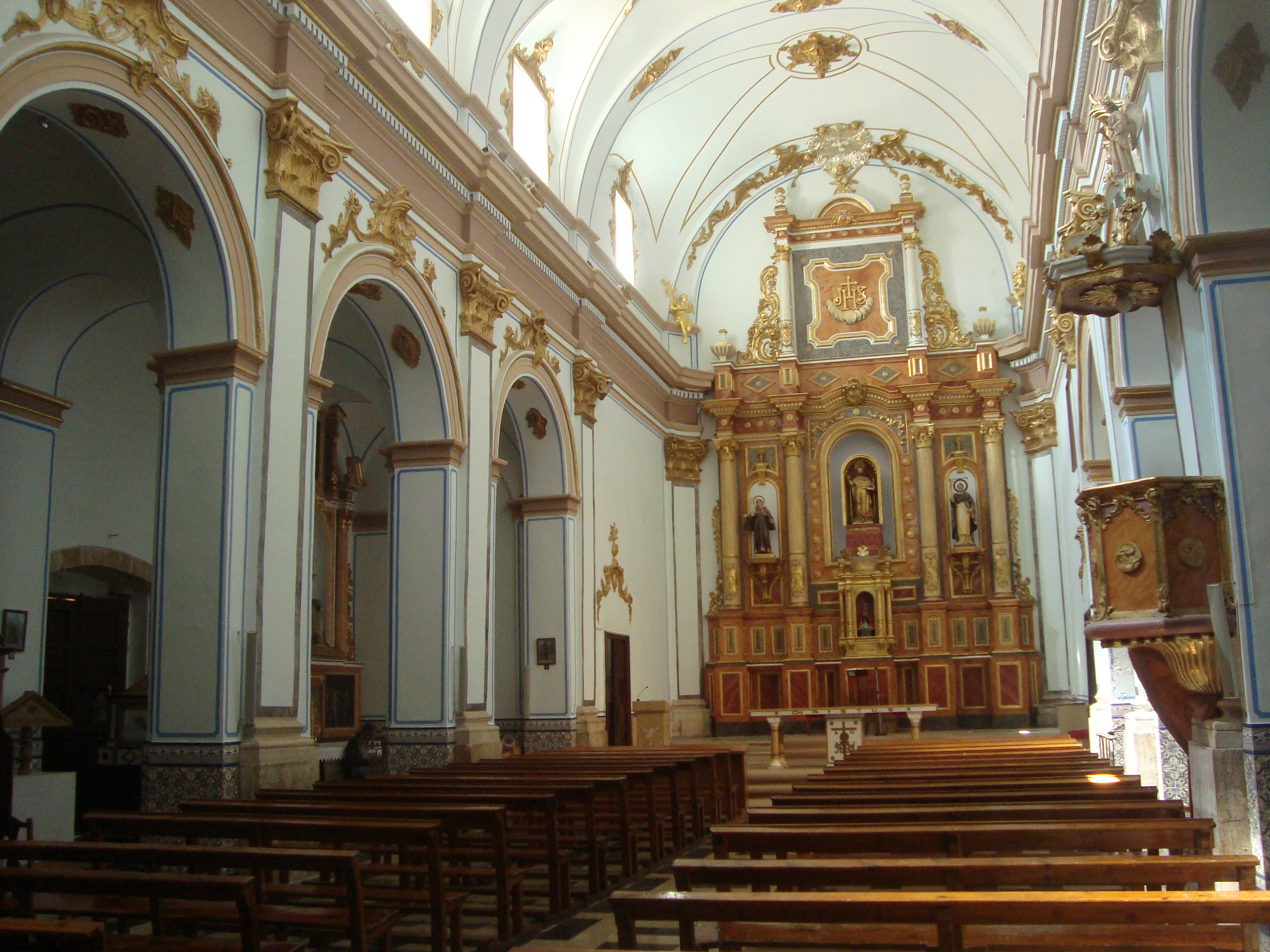
- Església parroquial de Sant Bartomeu (la Serra d'en Galceran)
  Els Rosildos
- Collet
- Els Bancals
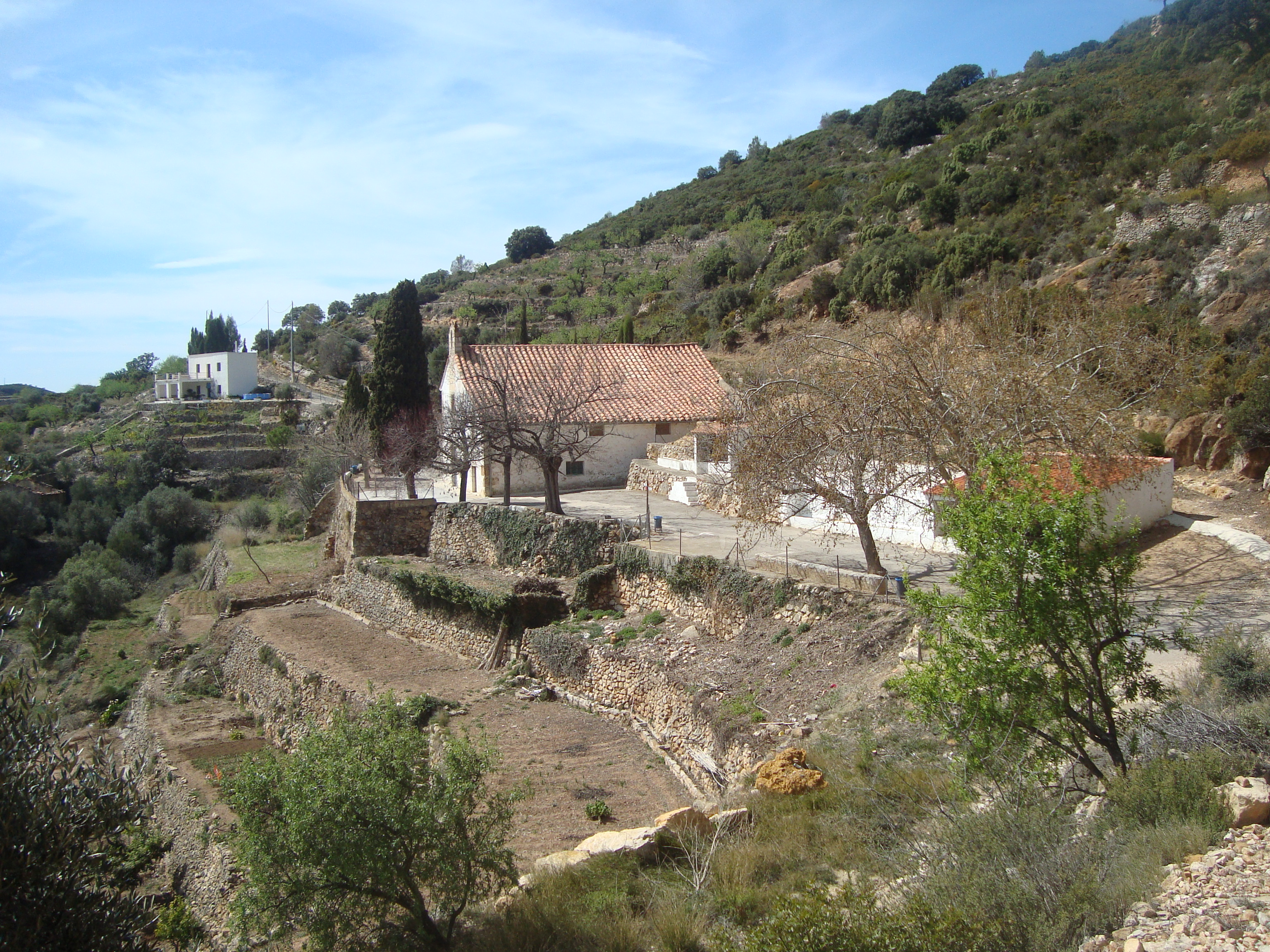
- Ermita de Sant Miquel Arcàngel (la Serra d'en Galceran)
  Pujols de Dalt
