= Vilanova d'Alcolea =

- Municipality
- Flag Coat of arms

- Location in Spain
- Coordinates: 40°13′51″N 0°04′18″E
- Country: Spain
- Autonomous community: Valencian Community
- Province: Castelló
- Comarca: Plana Alta
- Judicial district: Castelló de la Plana

Area
  - Total: 68.4 km^{2} (26.4 sq mi)
- Elevation: 344 m (1,129 ft)

Population (2025-01-01)
  - Total: 584
  - Density: 8.54/km^{2} (22.1/sq mi)
- Demonym(s): Vilanoví, vilanovina
- Time zone: UTC+1 (CET)
  - Summer (DST): UTC+2 (CEST)
- Postal code: 12183
- Official language(s): Valencian Spanish

Vilanova d'Alcolea (Spanish: Villanueva de Alcolea) is a municipality in the province of Castelló, Valencian Community, Spain. The town is located inland 36 km northeast of the town of Castelló de la Plana, on the north of the Valencian Community. It is a rural dryland farming town surrounded by vineyards as well as olive, almond and carob trees.

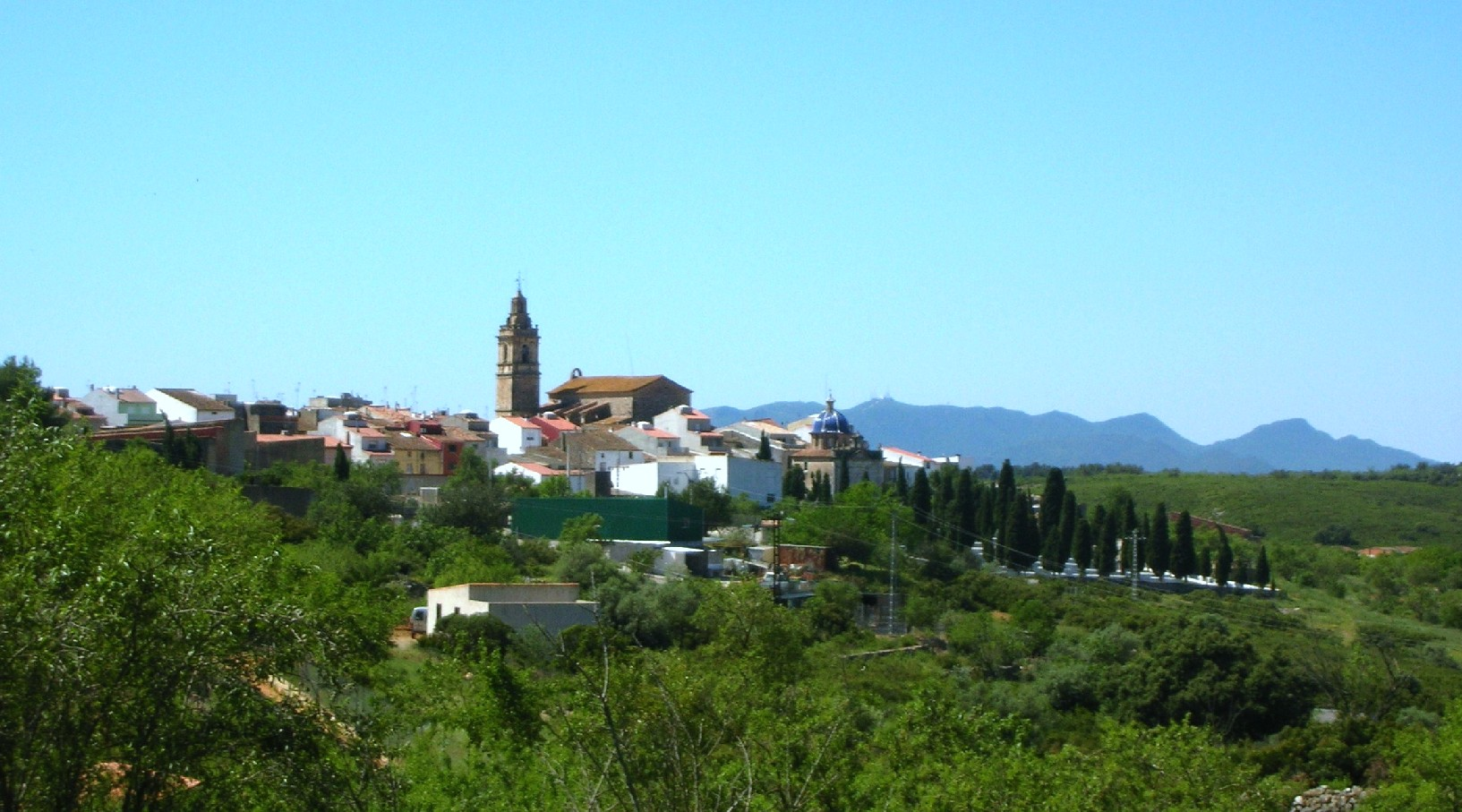
View of Vilanova d'Alcolea town with Desert de les Palmes mountain range in the background.

== History ==
Historically Vilanova d'Alcolea used to depend from Les Coves de Vinromà and, after the Moorish time to Blasco de Alagón, then in 1245 to the Knights of Calatrava and in 1295 to the Knights Templar. Finally from the year 1319 onwards it fell under the protection of the Knights of Montesa. Until the 19th century neighboring La Torre d'en Doménec depended from the Vilanova d'Alcolea parish.

== Airport ==
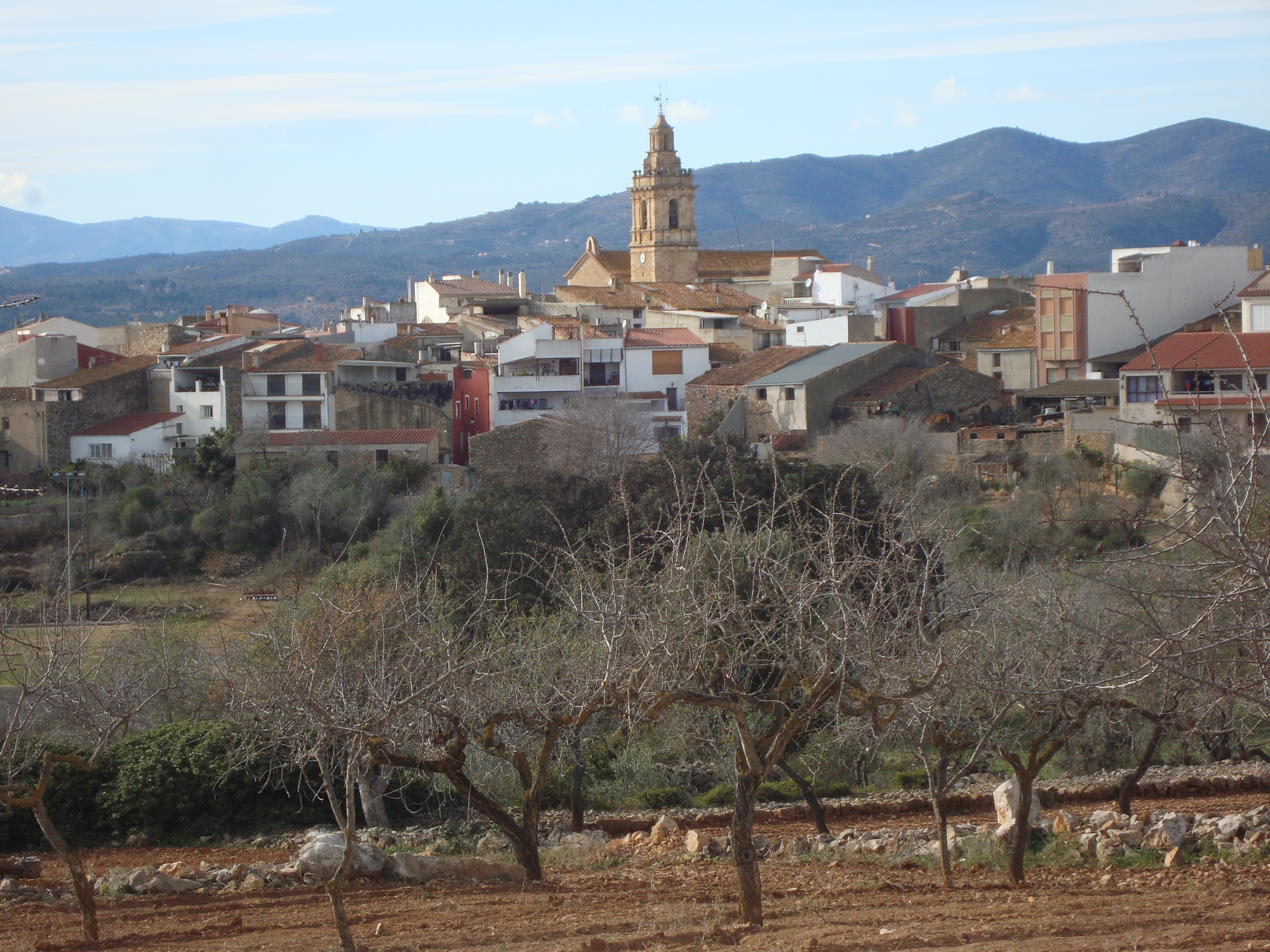
Vilanova d'Alcolea

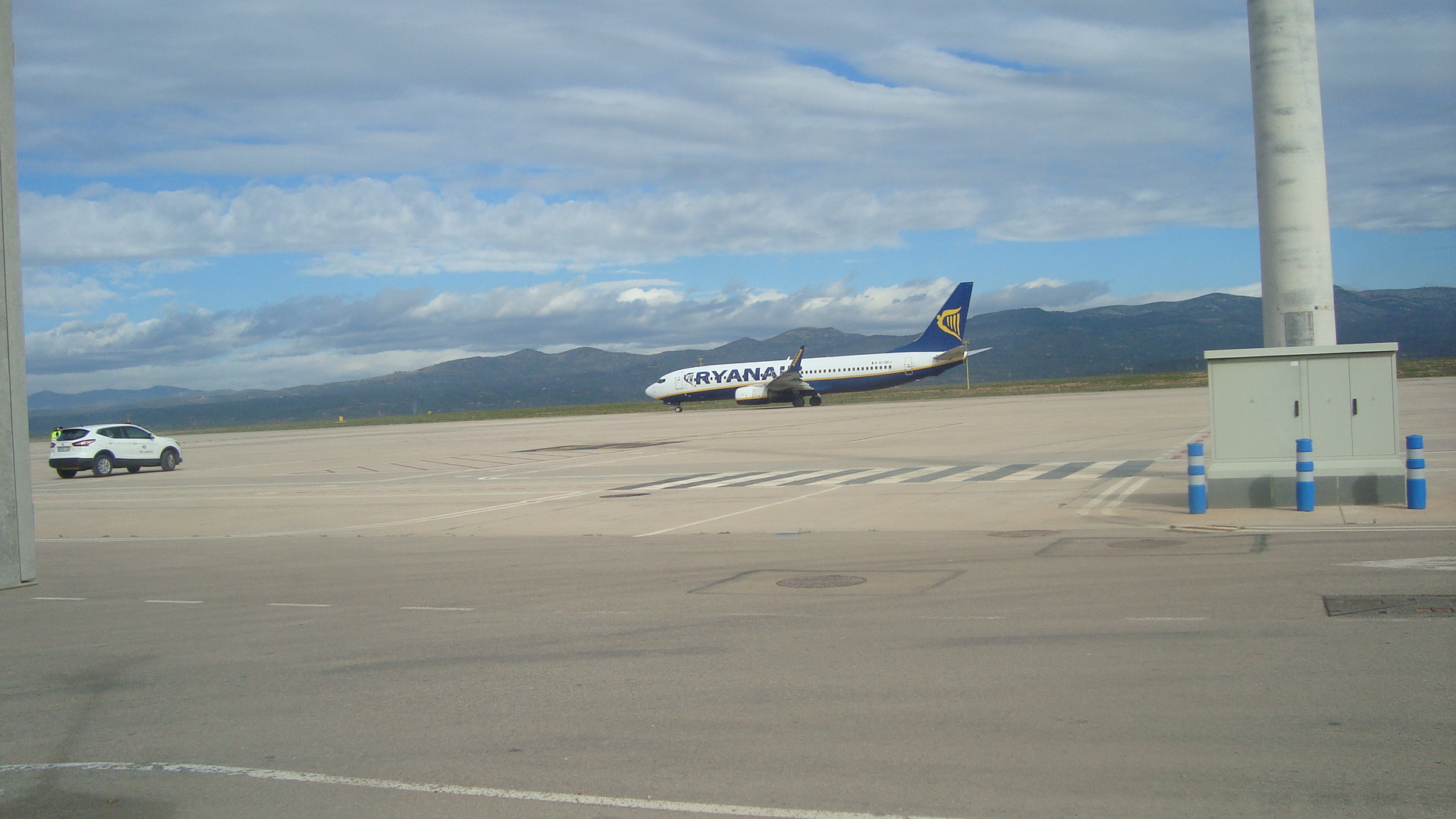
Castellón-Costa Azahar Airport (Vilanova d'Alcolea)

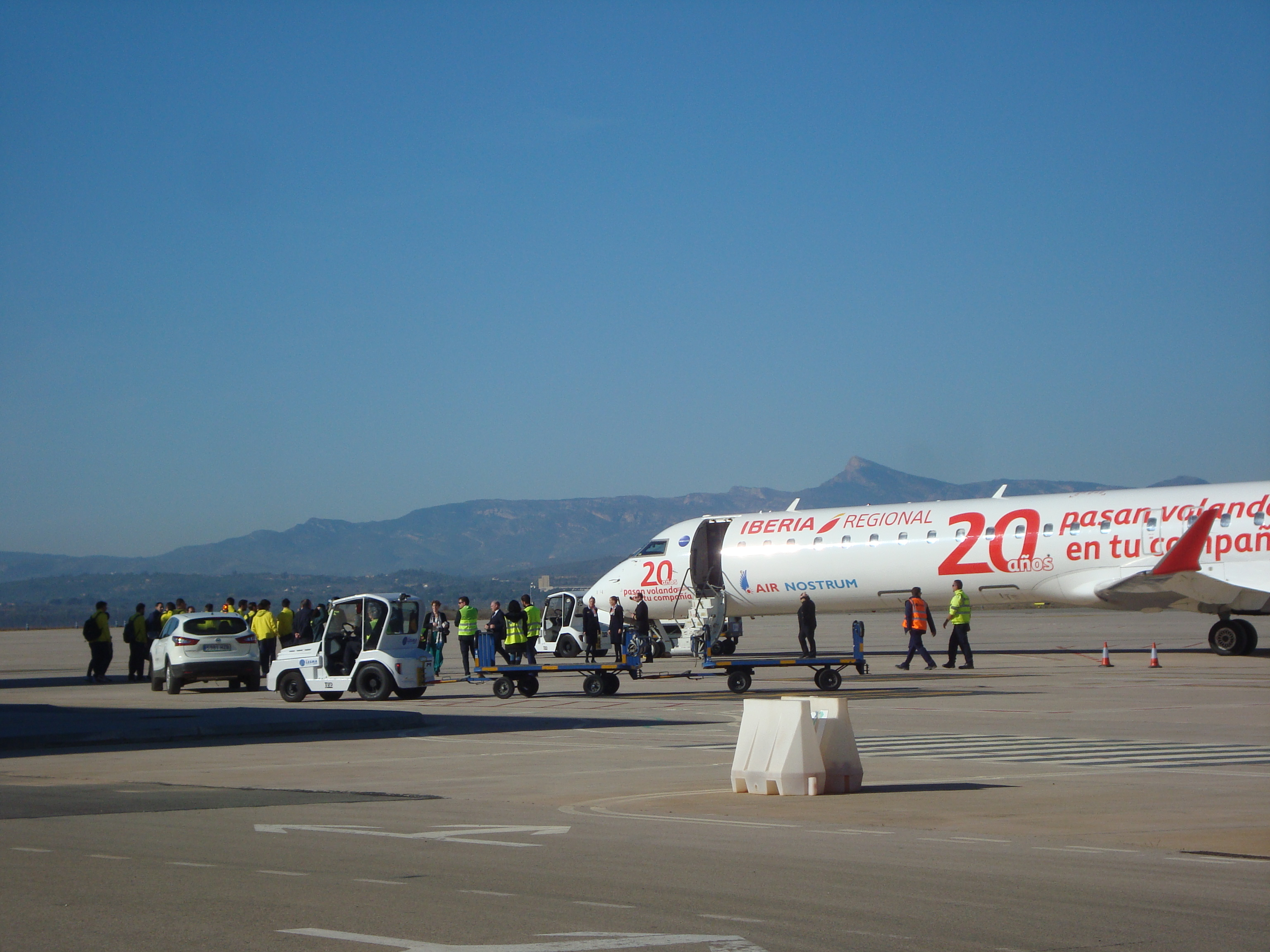
Castellón-Costa Azahar Airport (Vilanova d'Alcolea)

The airport of Castelló de la Plana, Aeroport de Castelló - Costa Azahar, has been built 2 km south of this town. Despite having been completed in 2011, the airport is still not in operation because of doubts about its viability for Valencia's Manises airport is relatively near to Castelló. Some groups that were concerned about the ecology of the region have questioned both the location and the need for the airport, but it was built nonetheless.

== Villages ==
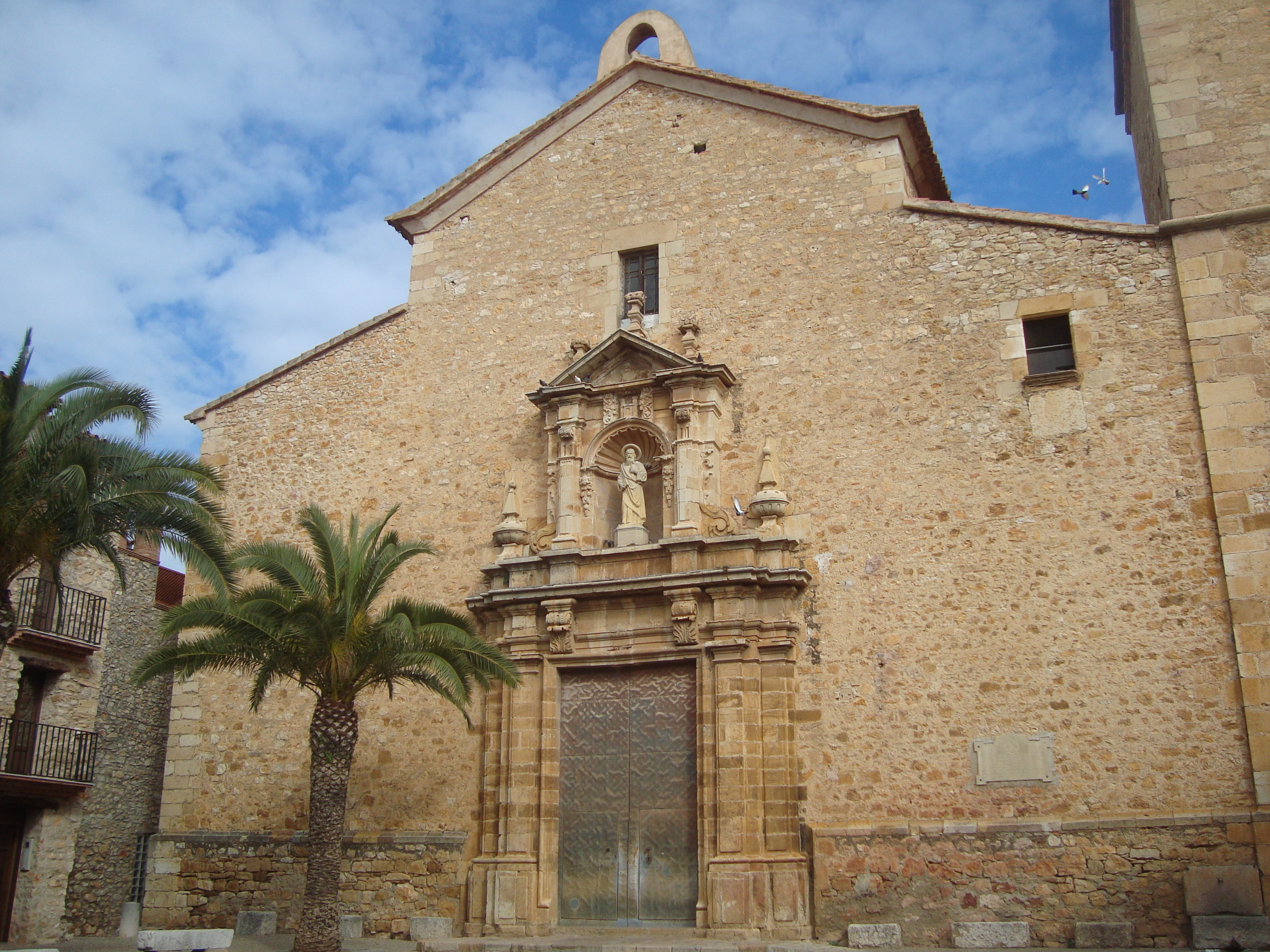
- Església de Sant Bartomeu (Vilanova d'Alcolea)
  Vilanova d'Alcolea
- Mas de Calaf
- Els Pasqualets
