= Les Coves de Vinromà =

les Coves de Vinromà Cuevas de Vinromá
- Municipality
- Flag Coat of arms

- Location of les Coves de Vinromà in the Province of Castellón Location of les Coves de Vinromà in the Valencian Community Location of les Coves de Vinromà in Spain
- Coordinates: 40°18′28″N 0°7′21″E
- Country: Spain
- Autonomous community: Valencian Community
- Province: Castellón
- Comarca: Plana Alta

Area
  - Total: 136.4 km^{2} (52.7 sq mi)
- Elevation: 202 m (663 ft)

Population (2025-01-01)
  - Total: 1,888
  - Density: 13.84/km^{2} (35.85/sq mi)
- Time zone: UTC+1 (CET)
  - Summer (DST): UTC+2 (CEST)
- Postal code: 12185
- Website: https://www.lescovesdevinroma.es

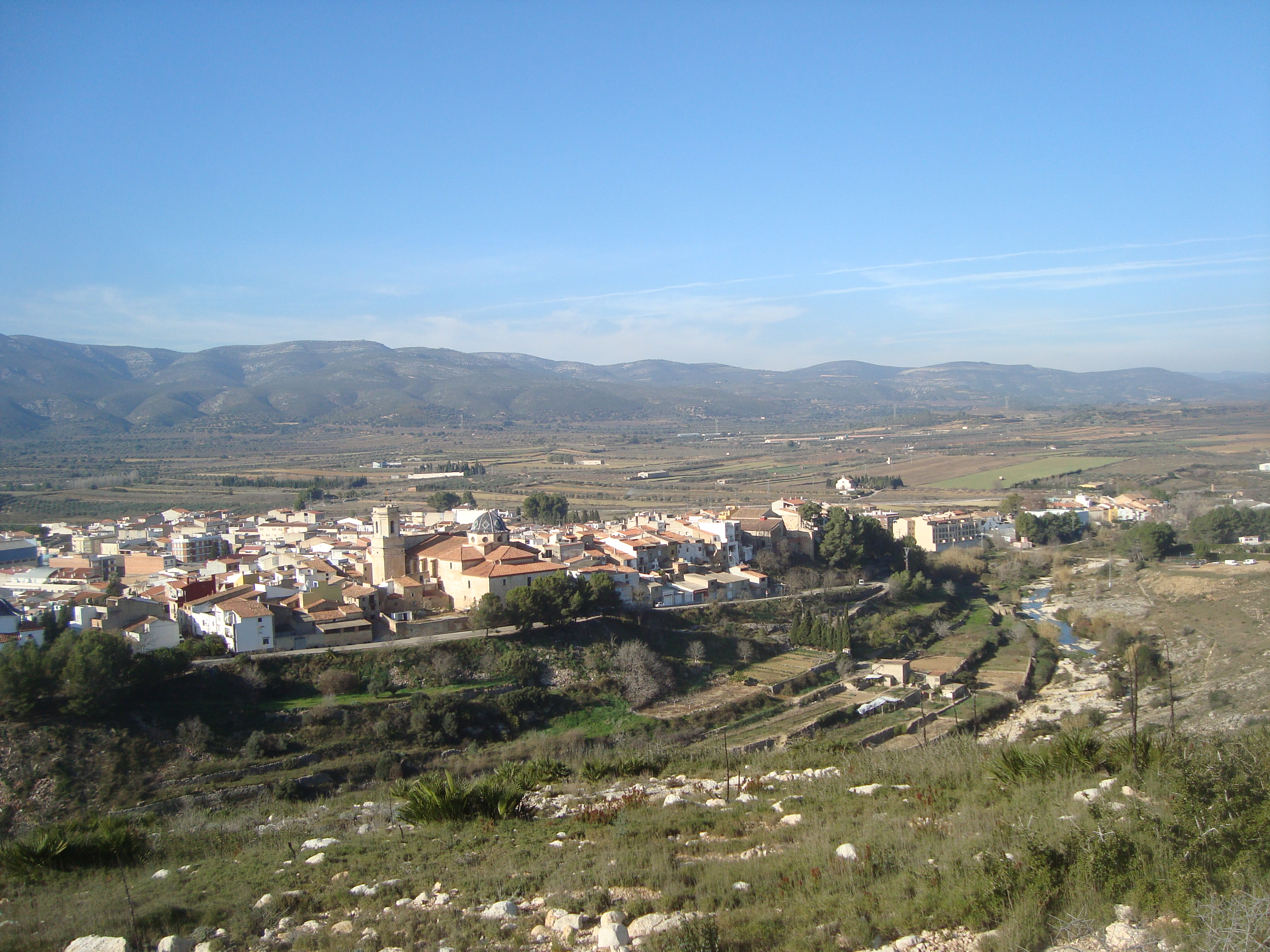
les Coves de Vinromà

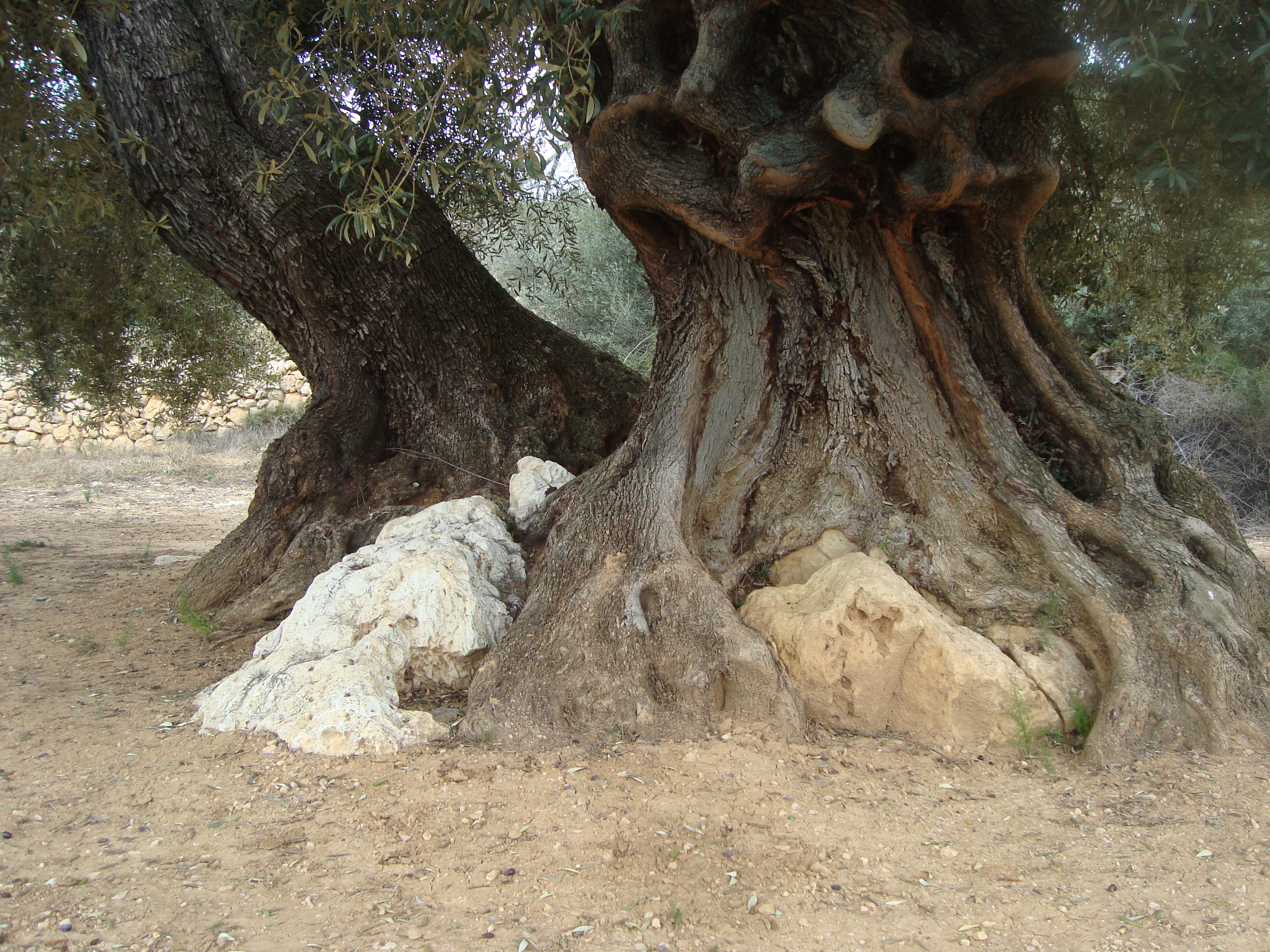
Oliveres mil-lenàries (les Coves de Vinromà)

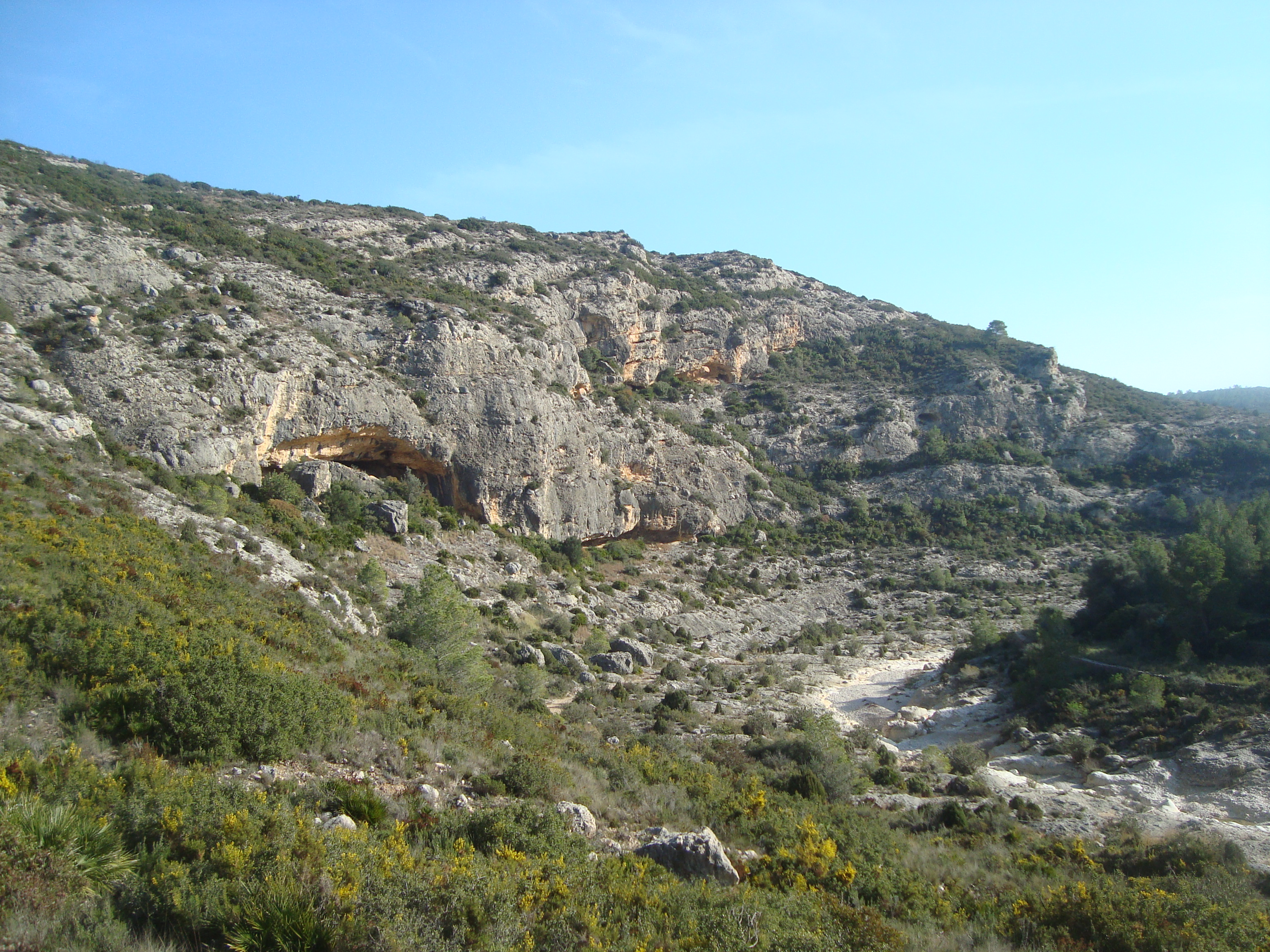
Rio de les Coves (les Coves de Vinromà)

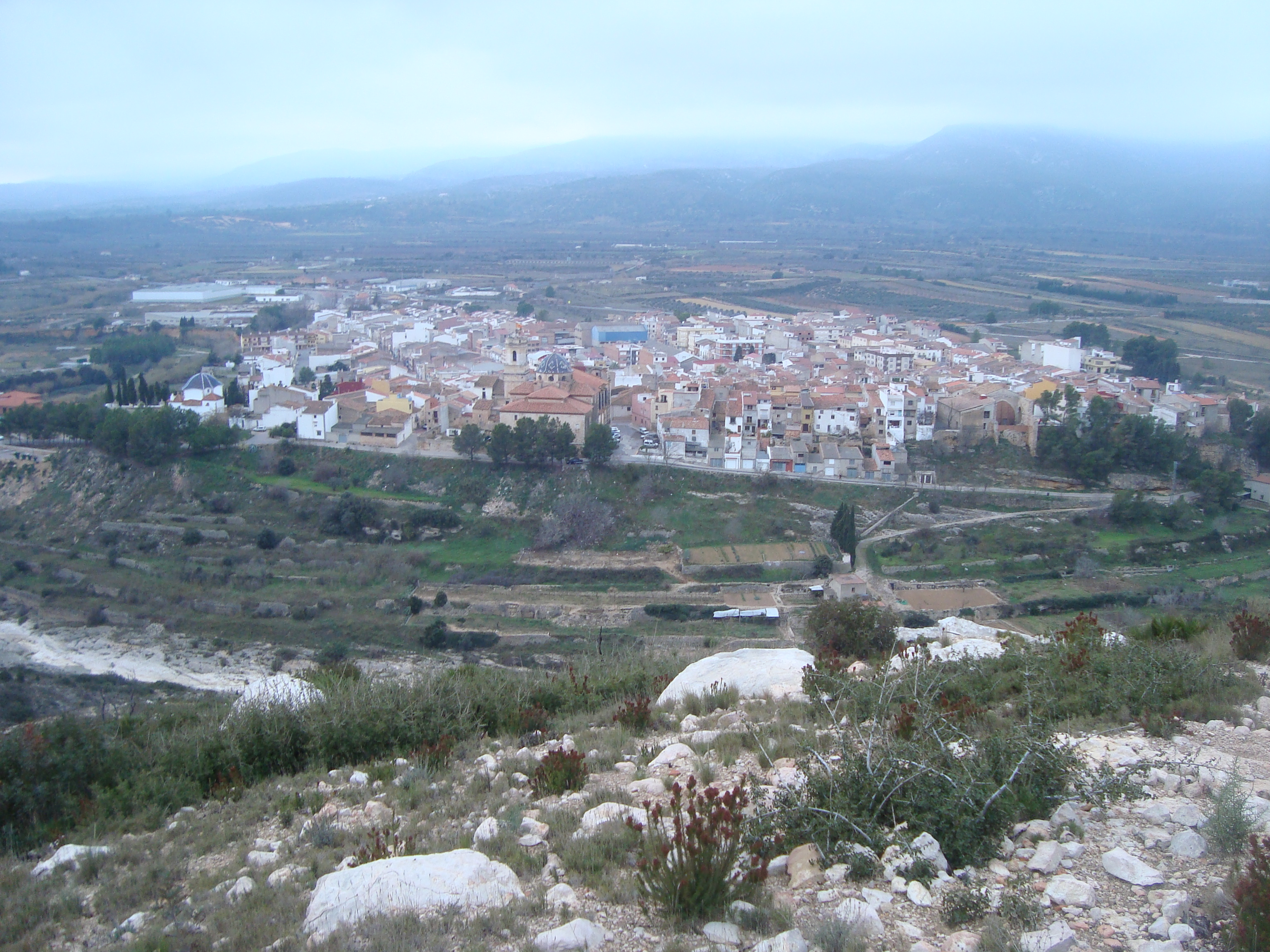
Panorámica de les Coves de Vinromà

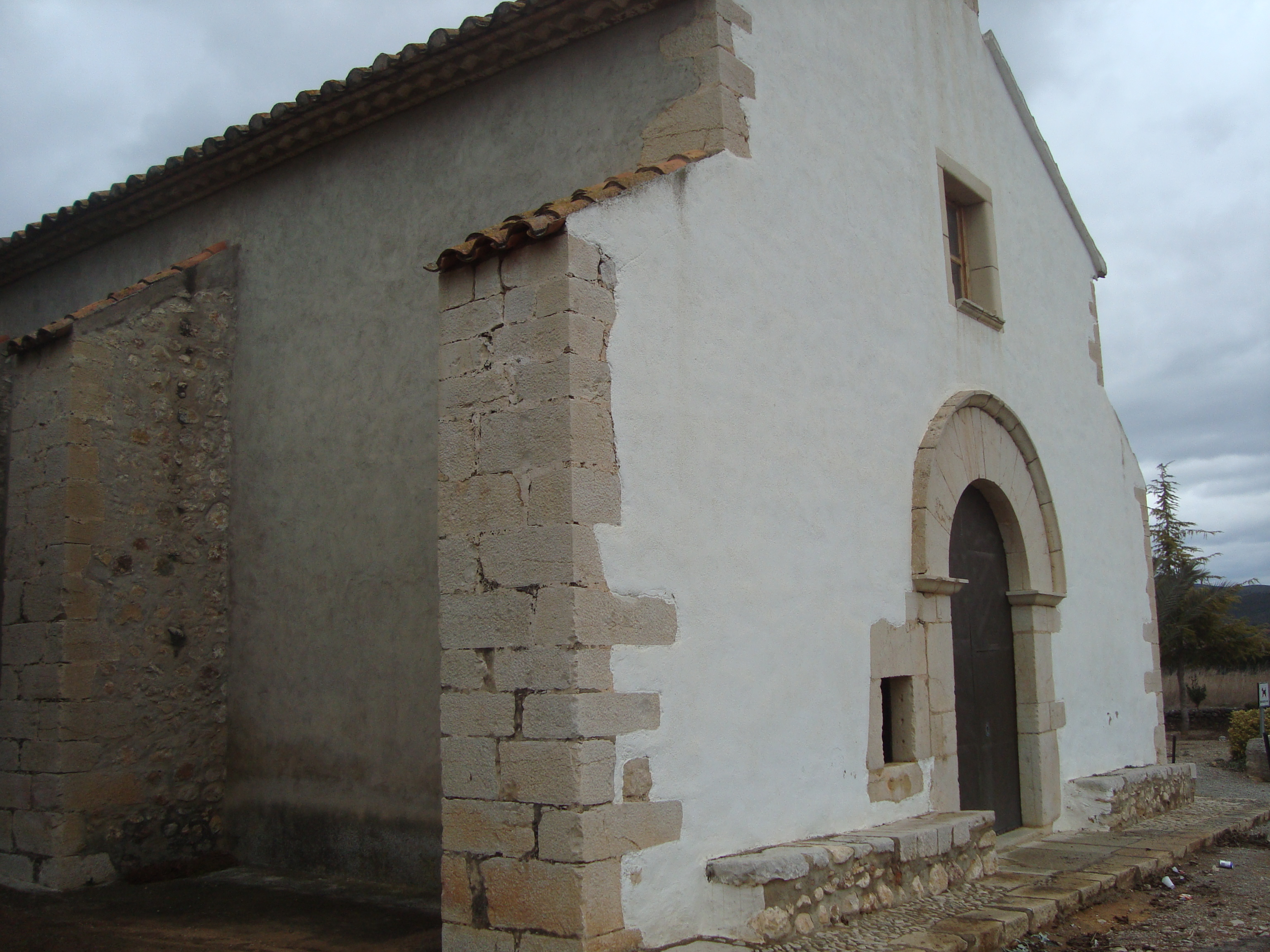
Ermita de Sant Vicent Ferrer, les Coves de Vinromà, Castelló

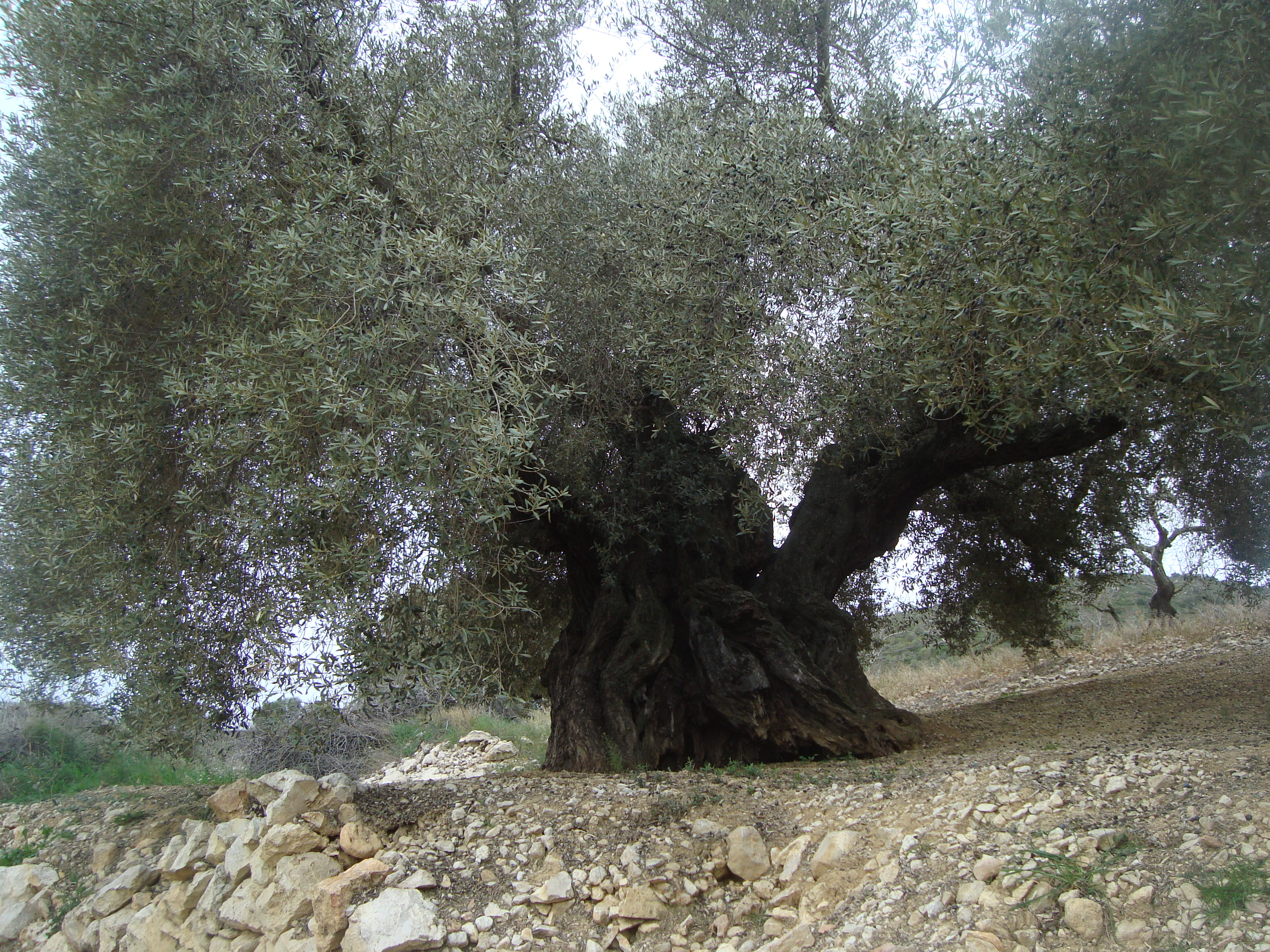
Olivera mil·lenària (les Coves de Vinromà)

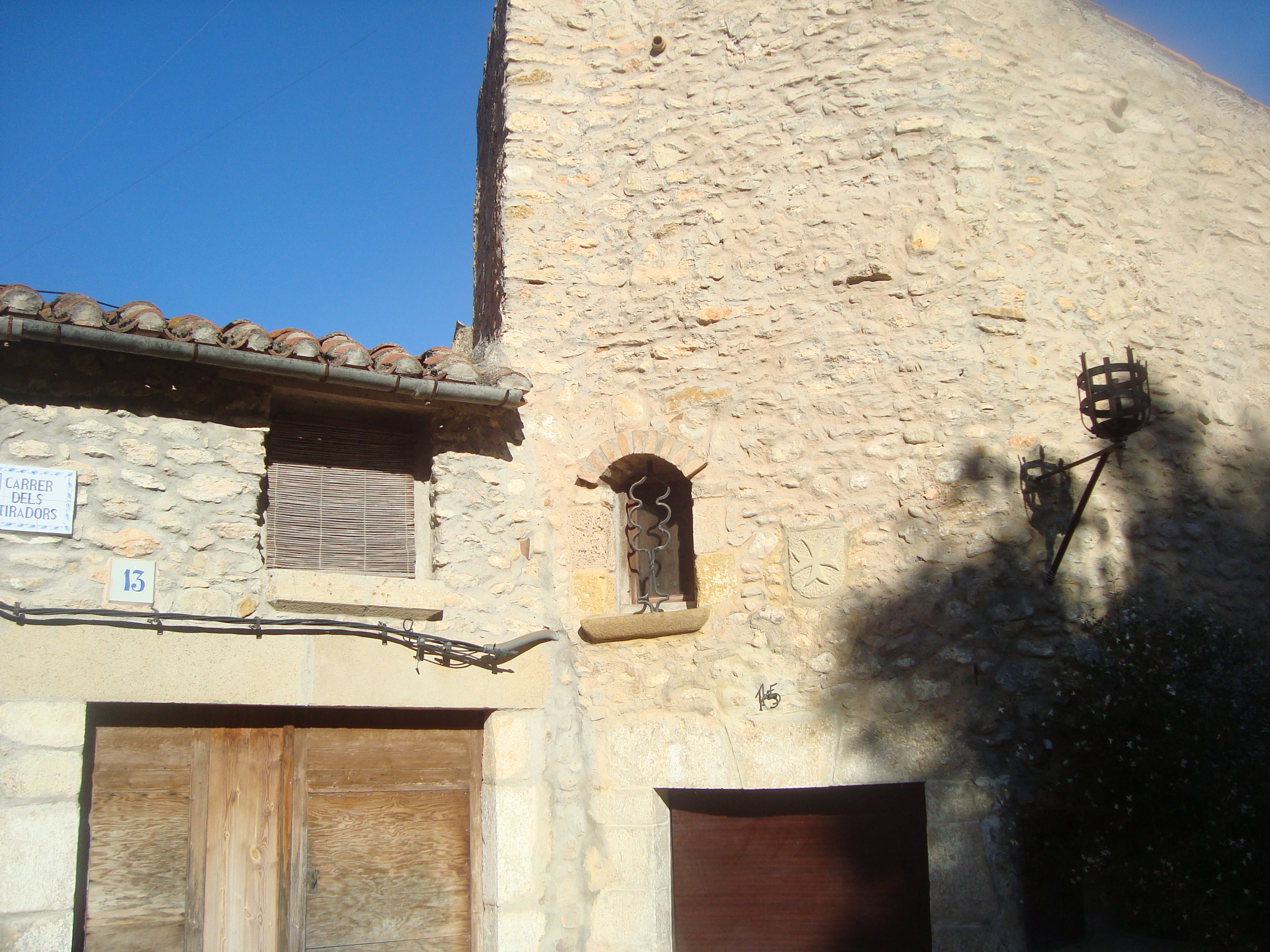
Casa del Temple

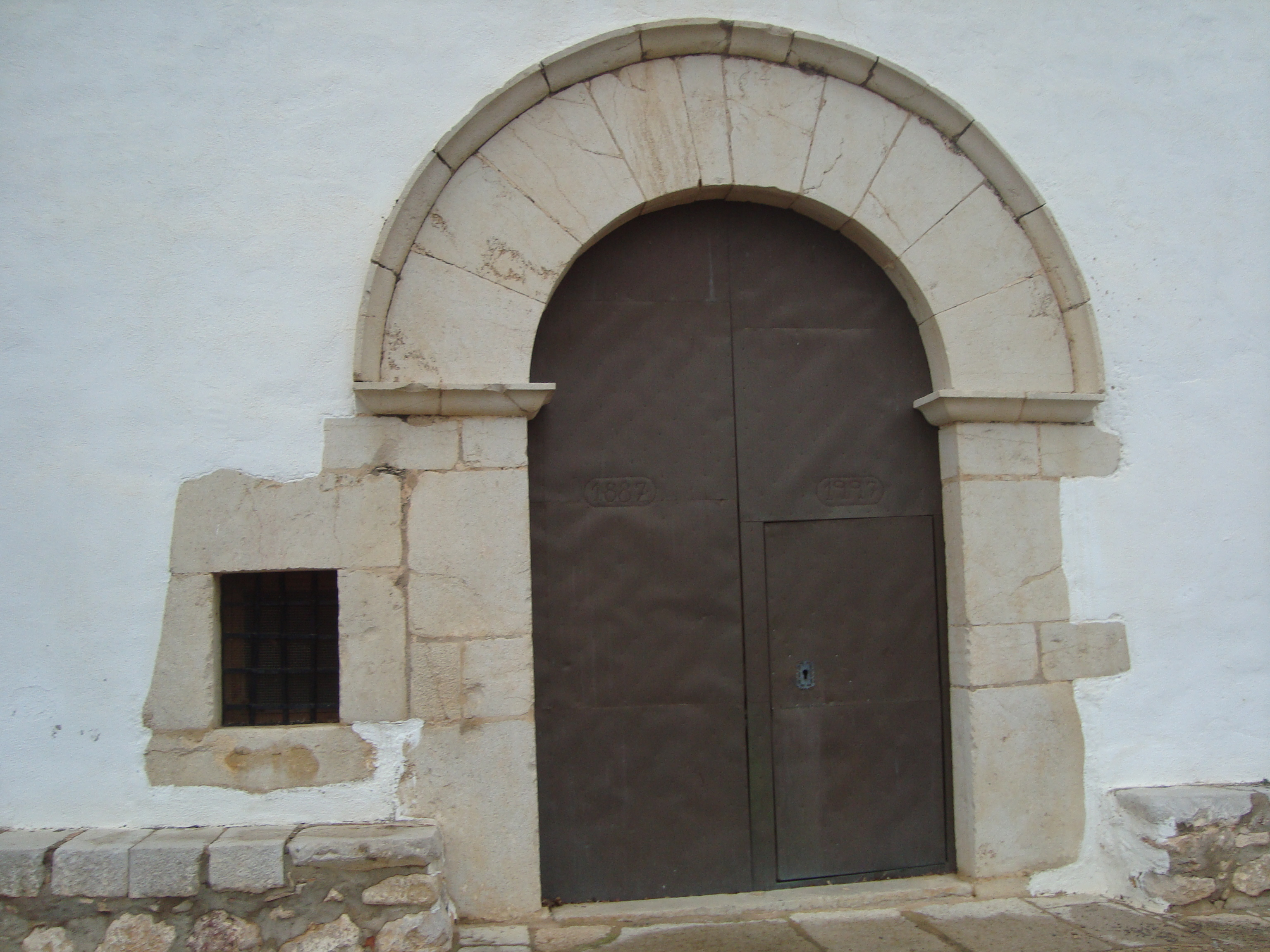
Puerta con arcada de medio punto de la ermita de Sant Vicent Ferrer (les Coves de Vinromà)

Les Coves de Vinromà is a municipality located in the province of Castellón, Valencian Community, Spain.

== See also ==
- List of municipalities in Castellón
