= List of Sites of Community Importance in Valencian Community =

This is a list of Sites of Community Importance in Valencian Community.

ID	Name	Coordinates	Image
ES0000023	Albufera (official name: L'Albufera); Other names: n/a	39.3053°N 0.3131°W	Looks like this Site of Community Interest has an image. Don't worry, you can take one of your own, and upload it too!
ES0000058	Natural Park of El Fondo (official name: el Fondo d'Elx-Crevillent); Other names: n/a	38.1872°N 0.7494°W	Looks like this Site of Community Interest has an image. Don't worry, you can take one of your own, and upload it too!
ES0000059	Llacunes de la Mata i Torrevieja (official name: Llacunes de la Mata i Torrevieja); Other names: n/a	38.0103°N 0.7025°W	Looks like this Site of Community Interest has an image. Don't worry, you can take one of your own, and upload it too!
ES0000060	Prat de Cabanes i Torreblanca (official name: Prat de Cabanes i Torreblanca); Other names: n/a	40.1697°N 0.1825°E	Looks like this Site of Community Interest has an image. Don't worry, you can take one of your own, and upload it too!
ES0000061	Columbretes Islands (official name: Árees emergides de les Illes Columbretes); Other names: n/a	39.895°N 0.6837°E	Looks like this Site of Community Interest has an image. Don't worry, you can take one of your own, and upload it too!
ES0000120	Salinas de Santa Pola (official name: Salinas de Santa Pola); Other names: n/a	38.1842°N 0.6206°W	Looks like this Site of Community Interest has an image. Don't worry, you can take one of your own, and upload it too!
ES0000147	Marjal de Pego-Oliva (official name: Marjal de Pego-Oliva); Other names: n/a	38.8736°N 0.0619°W	Looks like this Site of Community Interest has an image. Don't worry, you can take one of your own, and upload it too!
ES0000148	Marjal dels Moros (official name: Marjal dels Moros); Other names: n/a	39.6258°N 0.2561°W	Looks like this Site of Community Interest has an image. Don't worry, you can take one of your own, and upload it too!
ES0000211	Desembocadura del riu Millars (official name: Desembocadura del riu Millars); Other names: n/a	39.9297°N 0.0522°W	Looks like this Site of Community Interest has an image. Don't worry, you can take one of your own, and upload it too!
ES0000213	Serres de Mariola i el Carrascar de la Font Roja (official name: Serres de Mariola i el Carrascar de la Font Roja); Other names: n/a	38.7097°N 0.5489°W	Looks like this Site of Community Interest has an image. Don't worry, you can take one of your own, and upload it too!
ES0000462	Clot de Galvany (official name: Clot de Galvany); Other names: n/a	38.2451°N 0.534°W	Looks like this Site of Community Interest has an image. Don't worry, you can take one of your own, and upload it too!
ES5211007	Montgó Massif (official name: Montgó); Other names: n/a	38.811667°N 0.133056°E	Looks like this Site of Community Interest has an image. Don't worry, you can take one of your own, and upload it too!
ES5211009	Natural Park of Penyal d'Ifac (official name: Penyal d'Ifac); Other names: n/a	38.6348°N 0.0764°E	Looks like this Site of Community Interest has an image. Don't worry, you can take one of your own, and upload it too!
ES5212004	Riu Gorgos (official name: Riu Gorgos); Other names: n/a	38.755833°N 0.062222°W	Looks like this Site of Community Interest has an image. Don't worry, you can take one of your own, and upload it too!
ES5212006	Laguna de Salinas (official name: Laguna de Salinas); Other names: n/a	38.505°N 0.8905559999999999°W	Looks like this Site of Community Interest has an image. Don't worry, you can take one of your own, and upload it too!
ES5212007	Salero y Cabecicos de Villena (official name: Salero y Cabecicos de Villena); Other names: n/a	38.635833°N 0.915556°W	Looks like this Site of Community Interest has an image. Don't worry, you can take one of your own, and upload it too!
ES5212008	Maigmó i Serres de la Foia de Castalla (official name: Maigmó i Serres de la Foia de Castalla); Other names: n/a	38.556667°N 0.721111°W	Looks like this Site of Community Interest has an image. Don't worry, you can take one of your own, and upload it too!
ES5212009	Algepsars de Finestrat (official name: Algepsars de Finestrat); Other names: n/a	38.5683°N 0.2256°W	This Site of Community Interest has no photo. Take one and upload it! Thanks!
ES5212010	Arenal de Petrer (official name: Arenal de Petrer); Other names: n/a	38.511944°N 0.7783329999999999°W	This Site of Community Interest has no photo. Take one and upload it! Thanks!
ES5212011	Rambla de las Estacas (official name: Rambla de las Estacas); Other names: n/a	37.930833°N 0.726111°W	This Site of Community Interest has no photo. Take one and upload it! Thanks!
ES5212012	Sierra de Escalona y Dehesa de Campoamor (official name: Sierra de Escalona y Dehesa de Campoamor); Other names: n/a	37.935278°N 0.8325°W	Looks like this Site of Community Interest has an image. Don't worry, you can take one of your own, and upload it too!
ES5213018	Penya-segats de la Marina (official name: Penya-segats de la Marina); Other names: n/a	38.7308°N 0.1822°E	Looks like this Site of Community Interest has an image. Don't worry, you can take one of your own, and upload it too!
ES5213019	Aitana, Serrella i Puigcampana (official name: Aitana, Serrella i Puigcampana); Other names: n/a	38.65277800000001°N 0.219444°W	Looks like this Site of Community Interest has an image. Don't worry, you can take one of your own, and upload it too!
ES5213020	Serres del Ferrer i Bèrnia (official name: Serres del Ferrer i Bèrnia); Other names: n/a	38.6781°N 0.0569°W	Looks like this Site of Community Interest has an image. Don't worry, you can take one of your own, and upload it too!
ES5213021	Serra Gelada i Litoral de la Marina Baixa (official name: Serra Gelada i Litoral de la Marina Baixa); Other names: n/a	38.535°N 0.09°W	Looks like this Site of Community Interest has an image. Don't worry, you can take one of your own, and upload it too!
ES5213022	Serra de Crevillent (official name: Serra de Crevillent); Other names: n/a	38.265833°N 0.879167°W	Looks like this Site of Community Interest has an image. Don't worry, you can take one of your own, and upload it too!
ES5213023	Sierra de Callosa de Segura (official name: Sierra de Callosa de Segura); Other names: n/a	38.1278°N 0.9039°W	Looks like this Site of Community Interest has an image. Don't worry, you can take one of your own, and upload it too!
ES5213024	Tabarca (official name: Illa de Tabarca); Other names: n/a	38.1648°N 0.4747°W	Looks like this Site of Community Interest has an image. Don't worry, you can take one of your own, and upload it too!
ES5213025	Dunes de Guardamar (official name: Dunes de Guardamar); Other names: n/a	38.09777800000001°N 0.647778°W	Looks like this Site of Community Interest has an image. Don't worry, you can take one of your own, and upload it too!
ES5213026	Sierra de Orihuela (official name: Sierra de Orihuela); Other names: n/a	38.097222°N 0.980833°W	Looks like this Site of Community Interest has an image. Don't worry, you can take one of your own, and upload it too!
ES5213032	Cap de les Hortes (official name: Cap de les Hortes); Other names: n/a	38.3534°N 0.4206°W	Looks like this Site of Community Interest has an image. Don't worry, you can take one of your own, and upload it too!
ES5213033	Litoral de Cabo Roig (official name: Litoral de Cabo Roig); Other names: n/a	37.9104°N 0.7359°W	Looks like this Site of Community Interest has an image. Don't worry, you can take one of your own, and upload it too!
ES5213039	Sierra de Salinas (official name: Sierra de Salinas); Other names: n/a	38.514167°N 0.958889°W	Looks like this Site of Community Interest has an image. Don't worry, you can take one of your own, and upload it too!
ES5213042	Valls de la Marina (official name: Valls de la Marina); Other names: n/a	38.800556°N 0.188611°W	Looks like this Site of Community Interest has an image. Don't worry, you can take one of your own, and upload it too!
ES5213054	Alhorines Valley (official name: Els Alforins); Other names: n/a	38.797222°N 0.8°E	Looks like this Site of Community Interest has an image. Don't worry, you can take one of your own, and upload it too!
ES5214001	Cueva del Perro-Cox (official name: Cueva del Perro-Cox); Other names: n/a	38.1387°N 0.8986°W	This Site of Community Interest has no photo. Take one and upload it! Thanks!
ES5214002	Tunel de Canals (official name: Tunel de Canals); Other names: n/a	38.9283°N 0.5770000000000001°W	This Site of Community Interest has no photo. Take one and upload it! Thanks!
ES5214003	Cova dels Mosseguellos-Vallada (official name: Cova dels Mosseguellos-Vallada); Other names: n/a	38.9039°N 0.7372°W	This Site of Community Interest has no photo. Take one and upload it! Thanks!
ES5214004	Cova Juliana (official name: Cova Juliana); Other names: n/a	38.6774°N 0.4644°W	This Site of Community Interest has no photo. Take one and upload it! Thanks!
ES5221002	Desert de les Palmes Natural Park (official name: Desert de les Palmes); Other names: n/a	40.0758°N 0.0431°E	Looks like this Site of Community Interest has an image. Don't worry, you can take one of your own, and upload it too!
ES5222001	Serra d'Espadà (official name: Serra d'Espadà); Other names: n/a	39.9297°N 0.3847°W	Looks like this Site of Community Interest has an image. Don't worry, you can take one of your own, and upload it too!
ES5222002	Marjal de Peníscola (official name: Marjal de Peníscola); Other names: n/a	40.3714°N 0.4022°E	Looks like this Site of Community Interest has an image. Don't worry, you can take one of your own, and upload it too!
ES5222004	Curs alt del riu Millars (official name: Curs alt del riu Millars); Other names: n/a	40.066389°N 0.586667°W	Looks like this Site of Community Interest has an image. Don't worry, you can take one of your own, and upload it too!
ES5222005	Marjal de Nules (official name: Marjal de Nules); Other names: n/a	39.8358°N 0.1089°W	Looks like this Site of Community Interest has an image. Don't worry, you can take one of your own, and upload it too!
ES5222006	Platja de Moncofa (official name: Platja de Moncofa); Other names: n/a	39.777222°N 0.147778°W	This Site of Community Interest has no photo. Take one and upload it! Thanks!
ES5223002	Alt Maestrat (official name: L'Alt Maestrat); Other names: n/a	40.4219°N 0.165°W	This Site of Community Interest has no photo. Take one and upload it! Thanks!
ES5223004	Penyagolosa (official name: Penyagolosa); Other names: n/a	40.2397°N 0.39°W	Looks like this Site of Community Interest has an image. Don't worry, you can take one of your own, and upload it too!
ES5223005	Alto Palancia (official name: Alt Palància); Other names: n/a	39.9308°N 0.7208°W	Looks like this Site of Community Interest has an image. Don't worry, you can take one of your own, and upload it too!
ES5223007	Marjal d'Almenara (official name: Marjal d'Almenara); Other names: n/a	39.738889°N 0.196667°W	Looks like this Site of Community Interest has an image. Don't worry, you can take one of your own, and upload it too!
ES5223029	Bergantes (river) (official name: Riu Bergantes); Other names: n/a	40.703056°N 0.175833°W	Looks like this Site of Community Interest has an image. Don't worry, you can take one of your own, and upload it too!
ES5223036	Serra d'Irta (official name: Serra d'Irta); Other names: n/a	40.325278°N 0.3225°E	Looks like this Site of Community Interest has an image. Don't worry, you can take one of your own, and upload it too!
ES5223037	Litoral de Benicàssim (official name: Litoral de Benicàssim); Other names: n/a	40.0573°N 0.1032°E	Looks like this Site of Community Interest has an image. Don't worry, you can take one of your own, and upload it too!
ES5223053	Forat d'en Ferràs-Orpesa (official name: Forat d'en Ferràs-Orpesa); Other names: n/a	40.0876°N 0.1041°E	This Site of Community Interest has no photo. Take one and upload it! Thanks!
ES5223055	La Serra d'en Galceran (official name: Serra d'en Galceràn); Other names: n/a	40.3019°N 0.0001°E	Looks like this Site of Community Interest has an image. Don't worry, you can take one of your own, and upload it too!
ES5224001	Cova Obscura-Atzeneta del Maestrat (official name: Cova Obscura-Atzeneta del Maestrat); Other names: n/a	40.1997°N 0.2152°W	This Site of Community Interest has no photo. Take one and upload it! Thanks!
ES5232002	Serra Calderona (official name: Serra Calderona); Other names: n/a	39.7372°N 0.4411°W	Looks like this Site of Community Interest has an image. Don't worry, you can take one of your own, and upload it too!
ES5232003	Curs mitjà del riu Palància (official name: Curs mitjà del riu Palància); Other names: n/a	39.853056°N 0.471667°W	Looks like this Site of Community Interest has an image. Don't worry, you can take one of your own, and upload it too!
ES5232004	Rius del Racó d'Ademús (official name: Rius del Racó d'Ademús); Other names: n/a	40.075556°N 1.266944°W	This Site of Community Interest has no photo. Take one and upload it! Thanks!
ES5232005	Lavajos de Sinarcas (official name: Lavajos de Sinarcas); Other names: n/a	39.7564°N 1.2398°W	This Site of Community Interest has no photo. Take one and upload it! Thanks!
ES5232006	Alto Túria (official name: Alto Túria); Other names: n/a	39.8078°N 1.145°W	Looks like this Site of Community Interest has an image. Don't worry, you can take one of your own, and upload it too!
ES5232007	Júcar (official name: Riu Xúquer); Other names: n/a	39.117778°N 0.642778°W	Looks like this Site of Community Interest has an image. Don't worry, you can take one of your own, and upload it too!
ES5232008	Curs mitjà del riu Albaida (official name: Curs mitjà del riu Albaida); Other names: n/a	38.928889°N 0.4663890000000001°W	Looks like this Site of Community Interest has an image. Don't worry, you can take one of your own, and upload it too!
ES5232009	Serra del Castell de Xàtiva (official name: Serra del Castell de Xàtiva); Other names: n/a	38.9853°N 0.5192°W	Looks like this Site of Community Interest has an image. Don't worry, you can take one of your own, and upload it too!
ES5232010	Cap de Cullera (official name: Cap de Cullera); Other names: n/a	39.188056°N 0.216389°W	Looks like this Site of Community Interest has an image. Don't worry, you can take one of your own, and upload it too!
ES5233001	Tinença de Benifassà, Turmell i Vallivana (official name: Tinença de Benifassà, Turmell i Vallivana); Other names: n/a	40.6219°N 0.105°E	Looks like this Site of Community Interest has an image. Don't worry, you can take one of your own, and upload it too!
ES5233006	Puebla de San Miguel (official name: Puebla de San Miguel); Other names: n/a	40.058889°N 1.165°W	Looks like this Site of Community Interest has an image. Don't worry, you can take one of your own, and upload it too!
ES5233008	Sabinar de Alpuente (official name: Sabinar de Alpuente); Other names: n/a	39.9347°N 0.9372°W	This Site of Community Interest has no photo. Take one and upload it! Thanks!
ES5233009	Sierra de Utiel (official name: Sierra del Negrete); Other names: n/a	39.5972°N 1.0275°W	Looks like this Site of Community Interest has an image. Don't worry, you can take one of your own, and upload it too!
ES5233010	Hoces del Cabriel (official name: Hoces del Cabriel); Other names: n/a	39.4172°N 1.4672°W	Looks like this Site of Community Interest has an image. Don't worry, you can take one of your own, and upload it too!
ES5233011	Sierras de Martés y el Ave (official name: Sierras de Martés y el Ave); Other names: n/a	39.3025°N 0.8553°W	Looks like this Site of Community Interest has an image. Don't worry, you can take one of your own, and upload it too!
ES5233012	Valle de Ayora y Sierra del Boquerón (official name: Valle de Ayora y Sierra del Boquerón); Other names: n/a	39.1842°N 1.1222°W	Looks like this Site of Community Interest has an image. Don't worry, you can take one of your own, and upload it too!
ES5233013	Serra de Corbera (official name: Serra de Corbera); Other names: n/a	39.111389°N 0.326389°W	Looks like this Site of Community Interest has an image. Don't worry, you can take one of your own, and upload it too!
ES5233015	Serres del Montdúver i Marxuquera (official name: Serres del Montdúver i Marxuquera); Other names: n/a	39.001389°N 0.306389°W	Looks like this Site of Community Interest has an image. Don't worry, you can take one of your own, and upload it too!
ES5233030	Marjal de la Safor (official name: Marjal de la Safor); Other names: n/a	39.0336°N 0.1983°W	Looks like this Site of Community Interest has an image. Don't worry, you can take one of your own, and upload it too!
ES5233034	Sierra del Mugrón (official name: Sierra del Mugrón); Other names: n/a	38.948333°N 1.1275°W	Looks like this Site of Community Interest has an image. Don't worry, you can take one of your own, and upload it too!
ES5233035	Arroyo Cerezo (official name: Arroyo Cerezo); Other names: n/a	40.075833°N 1.381111°W	This Site of Community Interest has no photo. Take one and upload it! Thanks!
ES5233038	Dunes de la Safor (official name: Dunes de la Safor); Other names: n/a	38.970556°N 0.136667°W	Looks like this Site of Community Interest has an image. Don't worry, you can take one of your own, and upload it too!
ES5233040	Muela de Cortes y el Caroche (official name: Muela de Cortes y el Caroche); Other names: n/a	39.0639°N 0.8781°W	Looks like this Site of Community Interest has an image. Don't worry, you can take one of your own, and upload it too!
ES5233041	Serra de la Safor (official name: Serra de la Safor); Other names: n/a	38.870278000000006°N 0.271667°W	Looks like this Site of Community Interest has an image. Don't worry, you can take one of your own, and upload it too!
ES5233044	Sierra de Malacara (official name: Sierra de Malacara); Other names: n/a	39.4142°N 0.9533°W	Looks like this Site of Community Interest has an image. Don't worry, you can take one of your own, and upload it too!
ES5233045	Sierra de Enguera (official name: Serra d'Enguera); Other names: n/a	38.8978°N 0.8372°W	Looks like this Site of Community Interest has an image. Don't worry, you can take one of your own, and upload it too!
ES5233047	Ullals del riu Verd (official name: Ullals del riu Verd); Other names: n/a	39.146944°N 0.531944°W	This Site of Community Interest has no photo. Take one and upload it! Thanks!
ES5233048	Sima de les Graelles-Tous (official name: Sima de les Graelles-Tous); Other names: n/a	39.1138°N 0.667°W	This Site of Community Interest has no photo. Take one and upload it! Thanks!
ES5233049	Cova de les Rates Penades (Ròtova) (official name: Cova de les Rates Penades (Ròtova)); Other names: n/a	38.9327°N 0.2744°W	This Site of Community Interest has no photo. Take one and upload it! Thanks!
ES5233050	Cova de la Moneda-Cotes (official name: Cova de la Moneda-Cotes); Other names: n/a	39.0575°N 0.6128°W	This Site of Community Interest has no photo. Take one and upload it! Thanks!
ES5233051	Cova de les Meravelles de Llombai (official name: Cova de les Meravelles de Llombai); Other names: n/a	39.3131°N 0.5851°W	This Site of Community Interest has no photo. Take one and upload it! Thanks!
ES5234001	Cova del Sardiner-Sagunt (official name: Cova del Sardiner-Sagunt); Other names: n/a	39.7102°N 0.2732°W	This Site of Community Interest has no photo. Take one and upload it! Thanks!
ES5234002	Cueva Negra-Ayora (official name: Cueva Negra-Ayora); Other names: n/a	39.074°N 1.2089°W	This Site of Community Interest has no photo. Take one and upload it! Thanks!
ES5234003	Tunel del Carcalín-Buñol (official name: Tunel del Carcalín-Buñol); Other names: n/a	39.4156°N 0.8066°W	This Site of Community Interest has no photo. Take one and upload it! Thanks!
ES5234004	Cueva del Barranco Hondo-Cheste (official name: Cueva del Barranco Hondo-Cheste); Other names: n/a	39.5237°N 0.7244°W	This Site of Community Interest has no photo. Take one and upload it! Thanks!
ES5234005	Sima de l'Àguila-Picassent (official name: Sima de l'Àguila-Picassent); Other names: n/a	39.328°N 0.5232°W	This Site of Community Interest has no photo. Take one and upload it! Thanks!
ES5234006	Cova de les Meravelles d'Alzira (official name: Cova de les Meravelles d'Alzira); Other names: n/a	39.1248°N 0.4248°W	This Site of Community Interest has no photo. Take one and upload it! Thanks!
ES5234007	Cova Xurra-Gandia (official name: Cova Xurra-Gandia); Other names: n/a	38.9742°N 0.2149°W	This Site of Community Interest has no photo. Take one and upload it! Thanks!

== See also ==
- List of Sites of Community Importance in Spain
