= Abejuela =

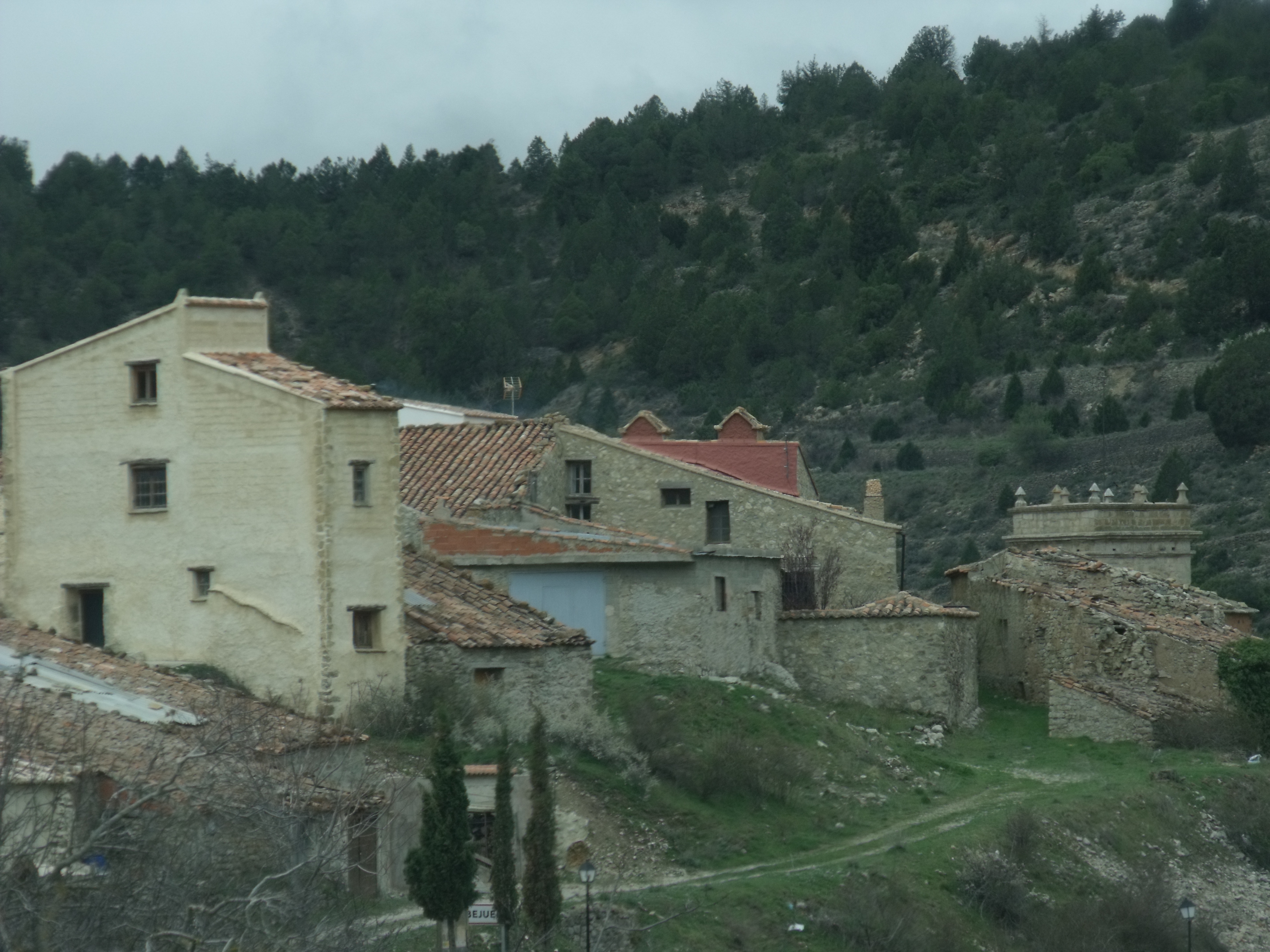

- Flag Coat of arms

- Location within Spain
- Coordinates: 39°55′N 0°54′W
- Country: Spain
- Autonomous community: Aragon
- Province: Teruel
- Municipality: Abejuela

Area
  - Total: 86.67 km^{2} (33.46 sq mi)
- Elevation: 1,169 m (3,835 ft)

Population (2025-01-01)
  - Total: 62
  - Density: 0.72/km^{2} (1.9/sq mi)
- Time zone: UTC+1 (CET)
  - Summer (DST): UTC+2 (CEST)

Abejuela is a municipality located in the province of Teruel, Aragon, Spain. According to the 2018 census (INE), the municipality has a population of 49 inhabitants. It is the southernmost town in Aragon.

Sierra de Javalambre rises north of the town and Sierra del Toro to the east.

== Economy ==
The economy of Abejuela is focused primarily on agriculture and livestock rearing. Some crops include wheat, barley, and outstanding quality truffle plantations, one of the best there is in Spain. Livestock rearing is also high quality because all livestock are fed almost completely 100% natural.

== History ==
There is little documentation on Abejuela, because almost all its files were destroyed in the Civil War.

It is known from oral tradition, that the first settlers were people exiled to its highest and coldest point called Almansa, where the hermitage of Santa Margarita is located. It is believed that around the fifteenth century the first buildings on what is now Abejuela were built, these are the Church and the military tower in the square.

Abejuela, is still one of the few towns that retains almost all of its architecture intact, with renovations remaining faithful to its surroundings and despite the years they have been kept in perfect condition.

== Location ==
The distance of Abejuela from Teruel is 79 km (49 mi), 78 km (48 mi) from Valencia. It is within the Gúdar Javalambre region. Abejuela, has 8,000 hectares (20,000 acres) of forest and farmland between altitudes of 800 and 1,610 m (2,620 and 5,280 ft). The population is located at 1,167 m (3,829 ft) high.

For more than 50 years Abejuela maintained communication with its province (Teruel) since at this time it was only accessible from Aragon by a municipal road or a detour of 35 kilometers (22 mi) through the province of Valencia.

The municipal district of Abejuela is bounded by Manzanera on the north, south and west by the Yesa, Chelva and Higueruelas and on the east by Andilla and el Toro, all these in the Valencia province except El Toro (Castellon).

== La Cervera ==
Within the municipality is the hamlet of La Cervera. It is undergoing total abandonment, due to the lack of electricity and water. La Cervera is located about 8 km (5.0 mi) from the town and in its time was critical to the survival of Abejuela, because the weather there was softer and its lands were used for grazing and other necessities which in times of snow were useful within the district.

== Feasts ==
The following feasts are celebrated on the following dates:

- July 20 the feast of Santa Margarita. On this date the pilgrimage to the Santa Margarita hermitage is celebrated.
- August 28 the feast of St. Augustine, Patron saint of Abejuela, and date on which the patron saint's day is celebrated.

== Monuments ==
- Saint Agustín parish church: Baroque style. Twentieth century. The Abejuela church is one of the few buildings in which its vault was made with the layout of a single arc.
- The Santa Margarita Hermitage is a thirteenth-century construction. Construction was ordered by King James. Currently there are five in Spain with the same construction.

== See also ==
- List of municipalities in Teruel
