= List of mountains in the Valencian Community =

This is a list of mountains and mountain ranges in the Valencian Community of Spain.

== List ==
Mountains of the Valencian Community by height
| Name | Comarca | Range | Height |
|---|---|---|---|
| Alto de las Barracas / Cerro Calderón (es) | Rincón de Ademuz, Gúdar-Javalambre | Sierra de Javalambre | 1839 m. |
| Penyagolosa | Alcalatén | Penyagolosa Massif | 1813 m. |
| Cabezo de las Cruces (ca) | Alt Millars | Sierra de Nogueruelas (Sierra de Gúdar) | 1710 m. |
| Tossal de Fraga | Alcalatén | Penyagolosa Massif | 1699 m. |
| Tossal de Els Mollats (Moleta del Tossal) | Alt Maestrat | Maestrat | 1656 m. |
| Alt del Asevar | Alcalatén | Serra de la Batalla | 1649 m. |
| Cruz del Herrero | Alt Millars | Sierra de Nogueruelas; Iberian System | 1639 m. |
| Roca Marcen | Alcalatén | Penyagolosa Massif | 1621 m. |
| Puntal de Magaña | Alt Palància | Serra del Toro | 1615 m. |
| Puntal del Agrillar | Alt Palància | Serra del Toro | 1613 m. |
| Alto del Tomatero | Alt Palància | Serra del Toro | 1607 m. |
| Puntal del Peiró | Alt Palància | Serra del Toro | 1603 m. |
| Alto Cabrera | Rincón de Ademuz; Gúdar-Javalambre | Sierra de Javalambre | 1561 m. |
| La Cruz de los Tres Reinos | Rincón de Ademuz; Sierra de Albarracín; Cuenca Province | Sierra de Albarracín | 1560 m. |
| Aitana | Alcoià; Comtat; Marina Baixa | Serra d'Aitana | 1559 m. |
| Baile | Alt Palància | Serra del Toro | 1537 m. |
| Tortajada | Rincón de Ademuz | Serra de Tortajada | 1514 m. |
| Alto del Viso | Serrans; Gúdar-Javalambre | Sierra de Javalambre | 1512 m. |
| La Muela | Serrans | Muelas de Alpuente | 1511 m. |
| Sancho | Serrans | Sierra de Javalambre | 1502 m. |
| Montcabrer | Comtat | Serra de Mariola | 1390 m. |
| El Cabezo | Rincón de Ademuz; Cuenca Province | Sierra de Albarracín | 1448 m. |
| Puig Campana | Marina Baixa | | 1410 m. |
| Cerro Negro | Serrans | Muelas de Alpuente | 1409 m. |
| Pina (Santa Barbara) | Alt Millars; Alt Palància | Sierra de Pina | 1405 m. |
| Massís del Maigmó | l'Alacantí | Serra del Maigmó | 1396 m. |
| Pla de la Casa | Marina Alta | Serrella | 1379 m. |
| Tossal dels Tres Reis | Baix Maestrat; Montsià/Matarranya | Ports de Beseit | 1350 m. |
| Tossal d'en Cervera | Baix Maestrat; Montsià | Ports de Beseit | 1347 m. |
| Cabezo Blanco | Alt Millars | Sierra de Nogueruelas; Iberian System | 1342 m. |
| Peñaescabia | Alt Palància | Serra del Toro | 1331 m. |
| Els Plans | Alacantí; Alcoià | Carrasqueta | 1330 m. |
| Mola d'Ares | Alt Maestrat | Maestrat | 1318 m. |
| Ariello | Alt Maestrat | | 1315 m. |
| Alto del Tis | Alt Millars | Sierra de Nogueruelas (Sierra de Gúdar) | 1312 m. |
| El Remedio | Plana d'Utiel | Serra d'Utiel | 1306 m. |
| El Cabezo | Serrans | Muelas de Alpuente | 1300 m. |
| El Maigmó | Alacantí; Alcoià; Vinalopó Mitjà | Massís del Maigmó | 1296 m. |
| Tossal de la Nevera (ca) | Alt Maestrat | Serra d'en Celler | 1281 m. |
| Muixacre | Ports | Serra de Vallivana | 1275 m. |
| Muela de Palomera | Vall de Cofrents | Sierra Palomera | 1260 m. |
| Tossal Gros | Ports | Serra del Turmell | 1253 m. |
| El Carrascar | Ports | Serra de la Creu | 1252 m. |
| El Tejo | Plana d'Utiel | Sierra de las Cabrillas | 1250 m. |
| Penya de l'Àguila | Baix Maestrat; Ports | Serra de Sant Cristòfol | 1248 m. |
| La Capilla (mountain) | Alto Vinalopó | Serra de Salines | 1238 m. |
| Fredes | Baix Maestrat | Serra de Sant Cristòfol | 1235 m. |
| La Replana | Alcoià; Alto Vinalopó | Serra de l'Arguenya | 1228 m. |
| Cabeçó d'Or | Alacantí | Serra del Cabeçó d'Or | 1210 m. |
| Pic Nevera | Alcalatén | Near Atzeneta del Maestrat | 1194 m. |
| Ponoig | Marina Baixa | Serra del Ponoig | 1181 m. |
| Cinco Pinos | Plana d'Utiel | Serra d'Utiel | 1177 m. |
| Juan Navarro | Plana d'Utiel | Serra d'Utiel | 1167 m. |
| La Atalaya | Plana d'Utiel | Serra d'Utiel | 1157 m. |
| Alto del Buitre | Cofrentes Valley | Sierra Palomera | 1146 m. |
| Tossal d'Orenga | Alt Maestrat | Serra d'en Celler | 1144 m. |
| Mola Garumba | Ports | | 1144 m. |
| Pico Ropé | Plana d'Utiel | Serra d'Utiel | 1140 m. |
| Santa Maria | Plana d'Utiel | Sierra de las Cabrillas | 1137 m. |
| Bèrnia | Marina Baixa / Marina Alta | Serra de Bèrnia | 1128 m. |
| Penya del Sit | Vinalopó Mitjà | Serra del Sit | 1127 m. |
| Caroig | Canal de Navarrés; Vall de Cofrents | Massís del Caroig | 1126 m. |
| Culla | Alt Maestrat | Mountain where Culla town stands | 1121 m. |
| Blasca | Alto Vinalopó | Serra de Biar | 1119 m. |
| Pic Nevera | Foia de Bunyol | Serra de Malacara | 1118 m. |
| Bicuerca | Plana d'Utiel | Serra de Bicuerca | 1117 m. |
| Palomas | Alt Palància | Serra Espina | 1115 m. |
| Alto del Mazorral | Alt Palància | Serra del Toro | 1111 m. |
| Penya de l'Hedra | Marina Alta | Serrella | 1110 m. |
| La Ràpita | Alt Millars (Villamalur) | Serra d'Espadà | 1106 m. |
| Benicadell | Comtat; Vall d'Albaida | Serra del Benicadell | 1104 m. |
| Pinar | Alt Millars; Alt Palància | Serra d'Espadà | 1101 m. |
| Penya Grossa | Vinalopó Mitjà | Serra d'Algaiat | 1099 m. |
| La Grana | Alacantí; Marina Baixa | Serra de la Grana | 1095 m. |
| Peñón de los Machos | Canal de Navarrés | Massís del Caroig | 1092 m. |
| Tossal de la Serrà | Alt Maestrat | Mountain close to Culla | 1090 m. |
| Esparreguera | Alt Maestrat | Serra d'Esparreguera | 1087 m. |
| Martés | Foia de Bunyol; Plana d'Utiel; Vall de Cofrents | Serra de Martés | 1086 m. |
| Pic Espadà | Plana Baixa (Alcúdia de Veo) | Serra d'Espadà | 1083 m. |
| Mugrón de Meca | Vall de Cofrents | Sierra del Mugrón | 1081 m. |
| Tossal de la Vila | Alcalatén; Plana Alta | Serra d'en Galceran | 1078 m. |
| Puntal del Conejo | Vall de Cofrents | Serra del Boquerón | 1066 m. |
| Penyarroja | Alcalatén | Serra d'En Segures | 1063 m. |
| Morral Blanc | Alt Maestrat | Serra d'Esparreguera | 1060 m. |
| Alt de Biscoi | Alcoià | Serra del Menejador | 1056 m. |
| Altos de Salomón | Vall de Cofrents | Massís del Caroig | 1056 m. |
| Cerro Carpio | Plana d'Utiel | Serra del Negrete | 1055 m. |
| Pic del Remei | Serrans | Serra del Remei | 1054 m. |
| Montserrat | Ports | Serra de Vallivana | 1041 m. |
| Presillas | Plana d'Utiel | Serra d'Aliaguilla | 1041 m. |
| Moluengo | Plana d'Utiel | Serra de Rubial | 1040 m. |
| Cerro del Pino Alto | Vall de Cofrents | Massís del Caroig | 1023 m. |
| Loma de la Cierva | Alt Millars; Alt Palància | Serra de los Tajos | 1022 m. |
| Buena Leche | Los Serranos | Tuéjar Mountains | 1021 m. |
| Nevera | Foia de Bunyol; Plana d'Utiel | Serra de Malacara | 1119 m. |
| La Safor | Comtat; Safor | Serra d'Ador | 1013 m. |
| Mola de Bicorp | Canal de Navarrés | Massís del Caroig | 1013 m. |
| El Frontón | Alt Palància; Serrans | Serra Calderona | 1011 m. |
| Mola de Penyablanca | Baix Maestrat | Serra del Turmell | 998 m. |
| Valdesierra | Plana d'Utiel | | 977 m. |
| L'Espadella | Alt Maestrat | Serra de l'Espadella | 968 m. |
| Coll d'Ares | Comtat | Serrella | 966 m. |
| Penya Blanca | Alcalatén; Plana Alta | Serra d'en Galceran | 951 m. |
| Tossal de l'Àliga | Alt Vinalopó; Vall d'Albaida | Serra de Mariola | 959 m. |
| El Montnegrell | Ports; Matarranya | | 943 m. |
| Tossal de la Toiola | Alcalatén; Plana Alta | Serra d'en Galceran | 939 m. |
| El Gorgo | Alt Palància | Serra Calderona | 907 m. |
| Cabeçó de la Sal | Vinalopó Mitjà | Serra del Reclot | 893 m. |
| Cova Alta | Alcoià; Vall d'Albaida | Serra d'Agullent | 890 m. |
| El Puntal | Vall de Cofrents | Sierra Palomera | 884 m. |
| Palmera | Canal de Navarrés | Serra d'Enguera | 880 m. |
| Pic de l'Àguila | Alt Palància; Camp de Túria | Serra Calderona | 878 m. |
| Peña Rubia | Alto Vinalopó | Serra de Mariola | 873 m. |
| Puig Cabrer | Baix Maestrat | | 864 m. |
| Cova Negra | Canal de Navarrés; Costera | Serra d'Enguera | 862 m. |
| La Nevera | Alt Millars; Alt Palància; Plana Baixa | Serra d'Espadà | 856 m. |
| Piezarroya | Camp de Túria | Serra Calderona | 844 m. |
| Mondúver | Safor | Massís del Mondúver | 841 m. |
| Alto de Camara | Vinalopó Mitjà | Serra de la Umbría | 838 m. |
| Montegordo | Alt Maestrat | Near Albocàsser | 837 m. |
| La Vella | Baix Vinalopó | Serra de Crevillent | 835 m. |
| Marc | Canal de Navarrés | Serra d'Enguera | 830 m. |
| Colaita | Canal de Navarrés; Ribera Alta | Serra del Caballó | 827 m. |
| Picatxo de Sant Gaietà | Baix Vinalopó | Serra de Crevillent | 817 m. |
| Las Cabras | Serrans | Serra Alcotas | 811 m. |
| Almayud | Alt Millars | Serra del Cabezo | 810 m. |
| Mola Gran | Baix Maestrat | Moles de Xert | 806 m. |
| Rebalsadors | Camp de Morvedre; Camp de Túria | Serra Calderona | 798 m. |
| Alto Gordo | Foia de Bunyol | Serra de Malacara | 798 m. |
| Cavall Verd | Comtat | Serra del Penyal | 793 m. |
| Coll de Rates | Marina Alta | Serra del Carrascar de Parcent | 780 m. |
| San Mayor | Alto Vinalopó | Sierra de la Villa | 777 m. |
| Penyalba | Safor | Massís del Mondúver | 772 m. |
| Alto de la Sabina | Alt Palància | Serra d'Espadà | 766 m. |
| Rives | Vall de Cofrents | Muela de Cortes | 757 m. |
| Aldaia | Safor | Serra del Buixcarró | 755 m. |
| Buitrera | Plana d'Utiel | Serra de Martés | 754 m. |
| Montgó | Marina Alta | Montgó Massif | 750 m. |
| El Pedregra | Costera | Serra Grossa | 744 m. |
| Collado de la Calera | Plana d'Utiel | | 737 m. |
| Castellar | Alto Vinalopó | Picachos de Cabrera | 730 m. |
| Bartolo | Plana Alta | Desert de les Palmes | 729 m. |
| Alt d'Eixea | Costera; Vall d'Albaida | Serra Grossa | 727 m. |
| El Agudo | Baix Segura | Serra de Crevillent | 725 m. |
| Tossal d'en Canes | Baix Maestrat | Serra de la Valldàngel | 715 m. |
| Picaio | Safor | Serra del Buixcarró | 699 m. |
| Cerro del Asno | Plana d'Utiel | Serra de Rubial | 694 m. |
| Belies | Vinalopó Mitjà | | 693 m. |
| Tossal Pelat | Marina Alta | | 693 m. |
| Cabrera | Alto Vinalopó | Sierra de Salinas | 689 m. |
| Cabeza del Fraile | Plana d'Utiel | Serra de Rubial | 685 m. |
| Monte Alto | Baix Vinalopó; Baix Segura | Serra de Crevillent | 682 m. |
| Ahorcado | Plana d'Utiel; Vall de Cofrents | | 667 m. |
| Cerruchón | Alto Vinalopó | Sierra de Salinas | 666 m. |
| Cabezo de la Virgen | Alto Vinalopó | Close to Villena | 655 m. |
| Peñalta | Serrans | | 651 m. |
| Talaia Grossa | Baix Maestrat | Talaies d'Alcalà | 635 m. |
| Revoltons | Baix Maestrat | Cervera Mountains | 635 m. |
| Peña de Orihuela | Baix Segura | Sierra de Orihuela | 634 m. |
| La Ratlla | Ribera Baixa; Favara | Serra de Corbera | 625,1 m. |
| La Plana | Canal de Navarrés; Costera | Serra d'Enguera | 618 m. |
| Motroton | Foia de Bunyol | Serra de Malacara | 613 m. |
| Cerro Cantalar | Alto Vinalopó; Costera | | 611 m. |
| Montí | Plana Baixa; Tales, Onda | Serra d'Espadà | 608 m. |
| Puntal de Massalari | Safor; Tavernes de la Valldigna, Benifairó de la Valldigna | Serra de Corbera | 602,2 m. |
| Planil | Canal de Navarrés | Massís del Caroig | 601 m. |
| Garbí | Camp de Morvedre; Camp de Túria | Serra Calderona | 593 m. |
| El Mirador | Safor | Serra del Toro | 590 m. |
| Los Pilones | Canal de Navarrés | Muela de Cortes | 588 m. |
| Cavall Bernat | Ribera Baixa; Corbera | Serra de Corbera | 587 m. |
| Penya de l'Ofra | Vinalopó Mitjà | Serra de l'Algaiat | 582 m. |
| Cabezo Redondo | Alto Vinalopó | Close to Villena | 574 m. |
| Pic Campanilles | Baix Maestrat | Serra d'Irta | 573 m. |
| Àguila | Baix Segura | Sierra de Callosa | 572 m. |
| - | Ribera Alta; Valldigna | Serra de les Agulles | 564 m. |
| Creu del Cardenal | Ribera Baixa / Ribera Alta; Llaurí / Alzira | Serra de Corbera | 544,5 m. |
| Les Creus | Safor | Serra de Corbera | 542 m. |
| Tossal de Sant Pere | Baix Maestrat | Serra de Sant Pere | 541 m. |
| l'Ouet | Ribera Baixa / Ribera Alta; Llaurí, Favara / Alzira | Serra de Corbera | 529 m. |
| El Cavall | Baix Maestrat | Serra de la Vall d'Àngel | 520 m. |
| Alto del Aliagar | Serrans | Serra de los Bosques | 504 m. |
| La Ferradura | Plana Alta | Desert de les Palmes | 501 m. |
| Mola | Baix Maestrat | Talaies d'Alcalà | 483 m. |
| El Gaidó | Plana Alta | | 480 m. |
| Alt de la Moleta | Baix Maestrat | Serra d'Irta | 467 m. |
| Lloma Llarga | Vall d'Albaida | Serra del Buixcarró | 466 m. |
| Raca | Plana Alta | Desert de les Palmes | 458 m. |
| La Talaiota | Plana Alta | | 453 m. |
| Tossal de Canet | Baix Maestrat | Serra del Turmell | 440 m. |
| Fontcalent | Alacantí; Baix Vinalopó | Serra de Fontcalent | 426 m. |
| El Castellet | Ribera Alta | Serra del Caballó | 418 m. |
| El Montot | Canal de Navarrés | | 417 m. |
| Alt del Gobernador | Marina Baixa | Serra Gelada | 400 m. |
| Penya del Migdia | Marina Alta | | 396 m. |
| La Salinera | Camp de Morvedre; Plana Baixa | Serra d'Espadà | 378 m. |
| Rodana Gran | Camp de Túria | Les Rodanes | 345 m. |
| Les Moletes | Ribera Alta | | 342 m. |
| Penyal d'Ifac | Marina Alta | | 332 m. |
| Les Pedrisses | Plana Alta; Plana Baixa | | 330 m. |
| Perenxisa | Foia de Bunyol; Horta Sud | Serra Perenxisa | 329 m. |
| Pujàlvarez | Baix Segura | | 314 m. |
| El Puig de Xàtiva | Costera | | 307 m. |
| Turó de les Maleses | Plana Alta | | 238 m. |
| Cabeç Bord | Camp de Túria | Serra Calderona | 238 m. |
| Serra Grossa | Baix Vinalopó | Serra de la Tabaià | 236 m. |
| Munt de l'Or | Ribera Baixa | Serra de les Raboses | 233,8 m. |
| El Tos Pelat | Camp de Túria | Serra Calderona | 225 m. |
| Cabezo Gordo | Baix Segura | Sierra de Orihuela | 174 m. |
| Benacantil | Alacantí | | 169 m. |

== Gallery ==
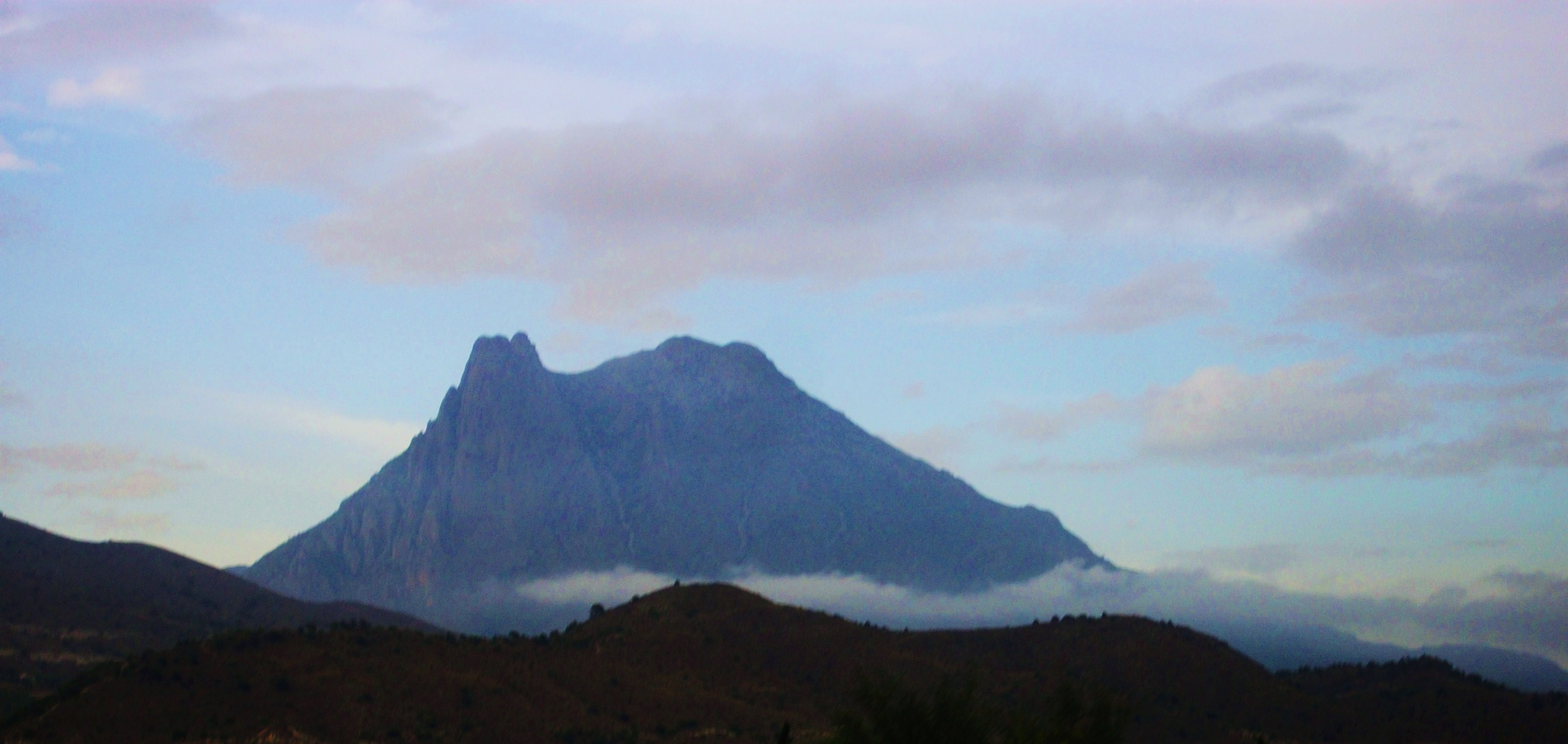
Puig Campana mountain near Benidorm.

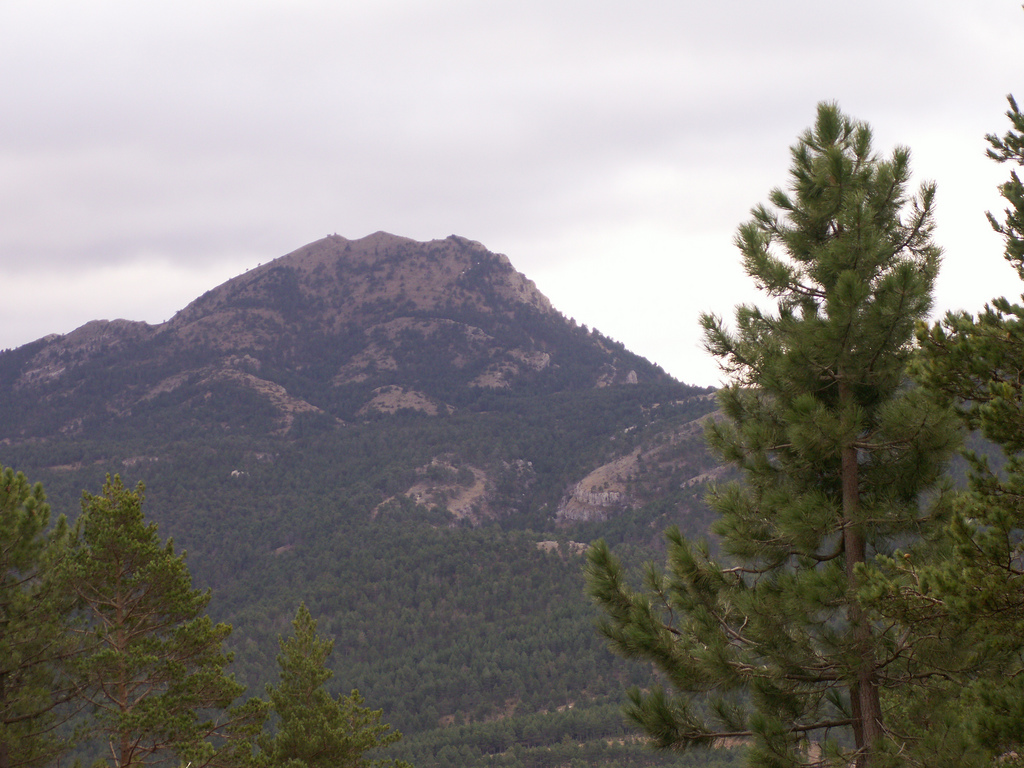
Penyagolosa; north face.

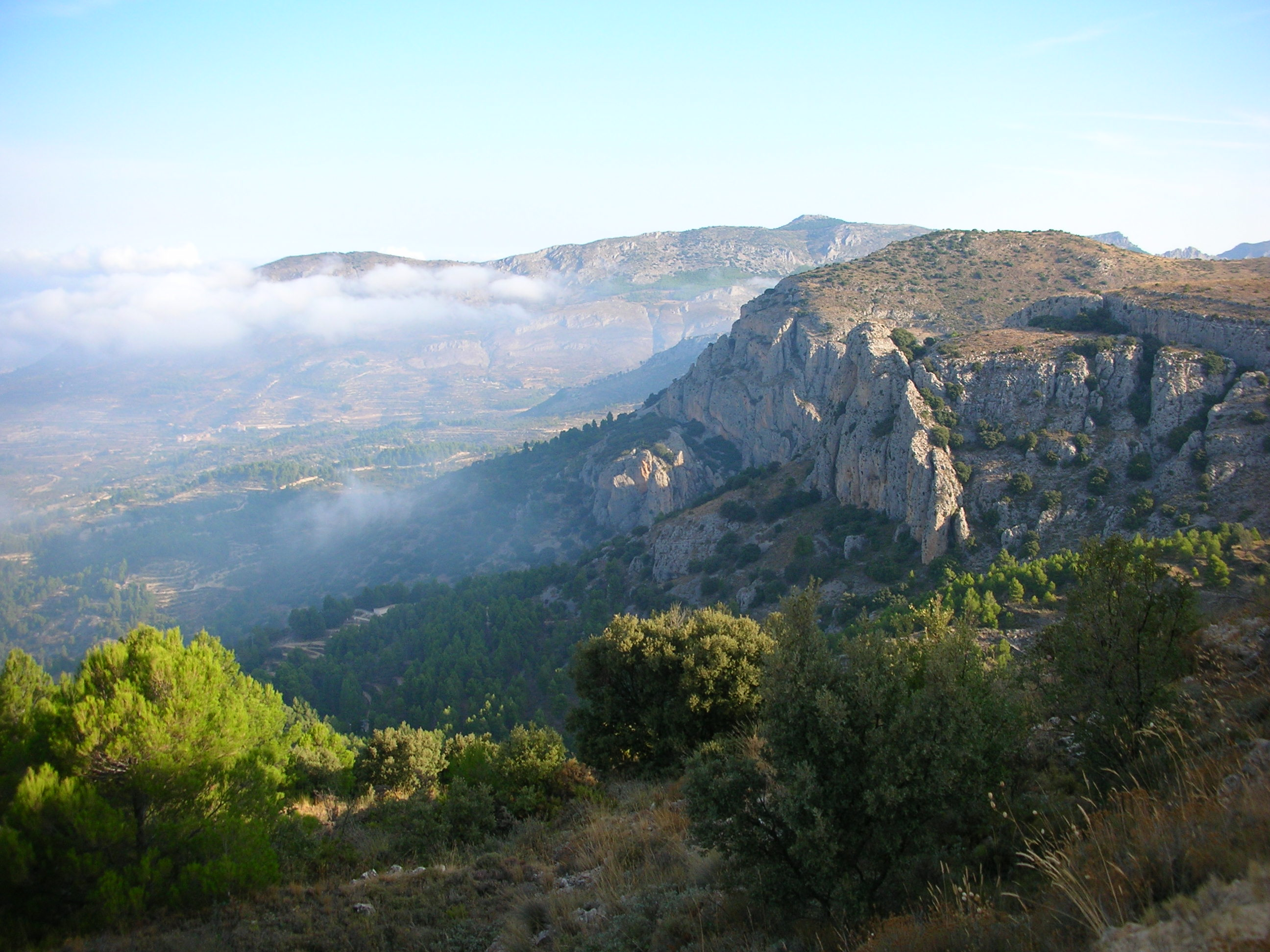
Aitana mountain in the mist.

== See also ==
- List of mountains in Aragon
- List of mountains in Catalonia
- Sistema Ibérico
- Catalan Mediterranean System
- Prebaetic System

== Sources ==
- VV.AA.(1999), Atlas Escolar del País Valencià, PUV (València), 50 pàg.
- ICV, Institut Cartogràfic Valencià.
- Topònims
- Auditoria Ambiental. Vol I
