= Maestrazgo =

Coordinates: 40°10′34″N 1°6′34″W

Maestrazgo / Maestrat
- Natural region
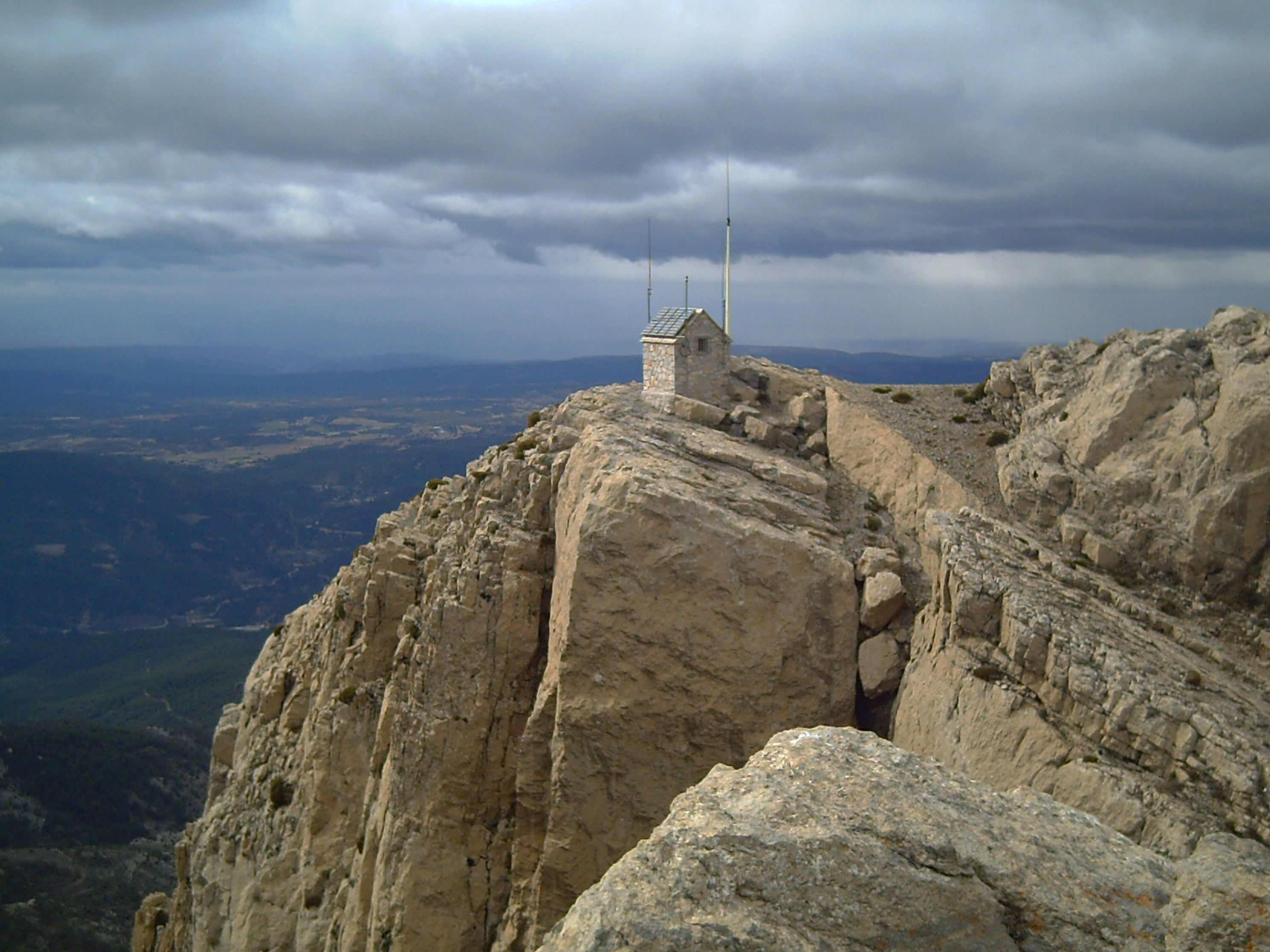
- Landscape in the area of the summit of Penyagolosa

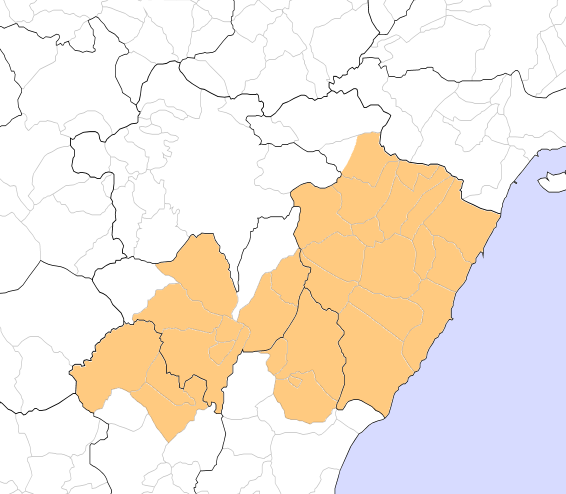
- A map of the historical extent of the Valencian Maestrat
- Country: Spain
- Elevation: 1,100 m (3,600 ft)

The Maestrazgo (Spanish: [maesˈtɾaðɣo]) or Maestrat (Valencian: [maesˈtɾat]) is a natural and historical mountainous region, located at the eastern end of the Sistema Ibérico mountain range, in Spain. It encompasses the north of the Autonomous Community of Valencia, in Castellón province, and parts of the east of the Aragonese province of Teruel. The area is mountainous and sparsely populated with a rich mixture of flora and fauna.

The district was under control of military orders following the 12th-century Christian reconquest of the area from the Moors. It also had a significant role in the 19th century Carlist Wars and the 20th century Spanish Civil War. After many years of decline the area is undergoing some re-vitalization, helped by funding from the European Union and tourism.

== History ==
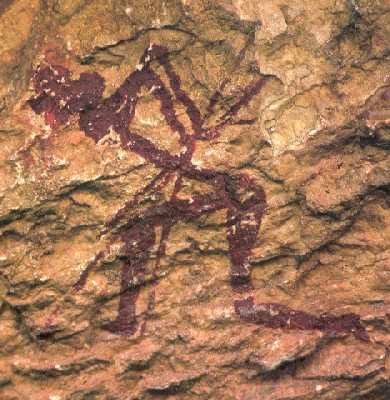
Cave painting at la Valltorta ravine.

The earliest signs of human habitation date back to the Pleistocene era, 25,000 years ago. Cave paintings have been discovered in many locations and they have been designated by UNESCO as part of the Rock Art of the Mediterranean Basin on the Iberian Peninsula World Heritage Site.

Occupation by the Ilercavones, a tribe of Iberians, Romans and the Moors followed, but the identity of the region was first established following the Reconquista when the area was dominated by military orders. Local stories persist that a group of Cathars, led by the perfectus Guillaume Bélibaste escaped from Carcassonne and took refuge in the Maestrazgo, living with a small community near Morella for about ten years, before being betrayed by a spy in the service of the Inquisition. Bélibaste was taken to Carcassonne and burnt at the stake there.

The name Maestrazgo is derived from the word maestre (English meaning - master) as these territories were historically under the jurisdiction of the Grand Masters of the military orders of the Knights Templar, St John of Malta and Montesa.

In 1838, during the Carlist Wars, the military district of la Comandancia General del Maestrazgo was created by Ramón Cabrera. During the Spanish Civil War the area was intensively fought over, especially after the fall of Teruel. Republican guerillas of the Agrupación guerrillera de Levante y Aragón held out in the mountains of the Maestrazgo until the 1950s.(see Spanish Maquis).

== Geography ==
The mountains in the Maestrazgo, like the Serra de la Creu, Serra d'En Segures, Talaies d'Alcalà, Serra de la Vall d'Àngel, Serra d'en Galceran, Serra d'Esparreguera, Serra de Sant Pere, Serra de Vallivana, Serra d'En Celler, Tossal de la Barbuda, Montegordo, the Cervera Mountains, Serra del Turmell, Serra de l'Espadella, Moles de Xert and the Benifassà Mountains, form the Mediterranean end of the Sistema Ibérico. The highest point is the 1,831 metres (6,007 ft) high Penyagolosa, located at the southern end of the region. At the base of the mountain is the important pilgrimage destination of Sant Joan de Penyagolosa.

In the Castellón province administrative divisions, the Maestrazgo is divided into Alt Maestrat and Baix Maestrat. The historical territory does not exactly match these boundaries including also parts of Alcalatén and Plana Alta. In Aragon, Teruel Province there is a comarca officially called Maestrazgo since 1999, but historically locations in other districts were also part of the Maestrazgo. The region has formed a Mancomunidad, a free association for cooperative purposes, between fifty five municipalities. Major settlements include Vilafranca, Cantavieja, Morella and Alcañiz.

The Maestrazgo Cultural Park has been established to protect the regional culture and landscape. The area lies between altitudes of 480 metres (1,570 ft) to 1,997 metres (6,552 ft) and is drained by the Guadalope and Turia rivers.

== Flora and fauna ==
The Maestrazgo supports a diverse section of plants and trees including thyme, rosemary, lavender, mint, pennyroyal, mountain tea, chamomile, black truffles, poplars, elms, ash, beech, holm oaks and black pine.

Fauna includes ibex, muflón, wildcats, otters, pine martens, foxes, genets, goshawks, Bonelli's eagles, sparrowhawks, owls, vultures, and game and fish such as partridges, quails, hares, rabbits, wild boar, trout, and catfish.

== Today ==
Tourism has in recent years brought a halt to economic decline in the region and the injection of European Union funding has led to the development of heritage centres and cooperatives providing training in practical crafts. Agriculture, including pigs, poultry, sheep, goats and smallholdings predominate in the valleys. In 1995, Ken Loach's award winning film about the Spanish Civil War, Land and Freedom, was filmed in the Maestrazgo. Life in the area and much of its history is described vividly in Jason Webster's 2009 book Sacred Sierra - A Year on a Spanish Mountain. Efforts have been made to halt de-population by attracting immigrants from South America and Romania. This has had some success, helping keeping village facilities alive.

In 2008 palaeontologists discovered an intact specimen of a previously unknown species of sauropod dinosaur at a site near Morella. The animal was believed to have lived in the early Cretaceous period, approximately 120 million years ago. Funding from wind energy companies and the regional government has aided the excavations and will support a dinosaur museum to be opened at Morella.

== Gallery ==
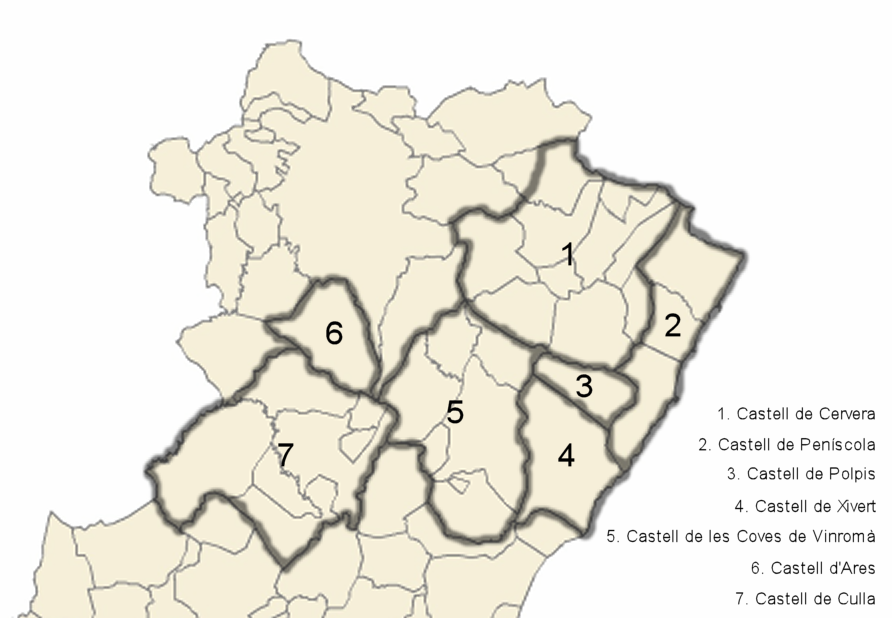
Dominions of the castles that ruled the historical Maestrazgo

== See also ==
- Mountains of the Valencian Community
- Ilercavonia
- Ports (comarca)
- Ports de Beseit
- Tinença de Benifassà
- Moles de Xert

== Bibliography ==
- Webster, Jason (2009). Sacred Sierra: A Year on a Spanish Mountain. London: Chatton & Windus. ISBN 978-0-7011-8157-4. Archived from the original on 2011-07-23.
