= Monte Gordo =

Monte Gordo may refer to:

- Monte Gordo, Cape Verde, the tallest mountain on the island of São Nicolau, Cape Verde
- Monte Gordo (Vila Real de Santo António), a civil parish in the municipality of Vila Real de Santo António, Algarve, Portugal

== See also ==
- Montegordo, a mountain in Spain
