= Talaies d'Alcalà =

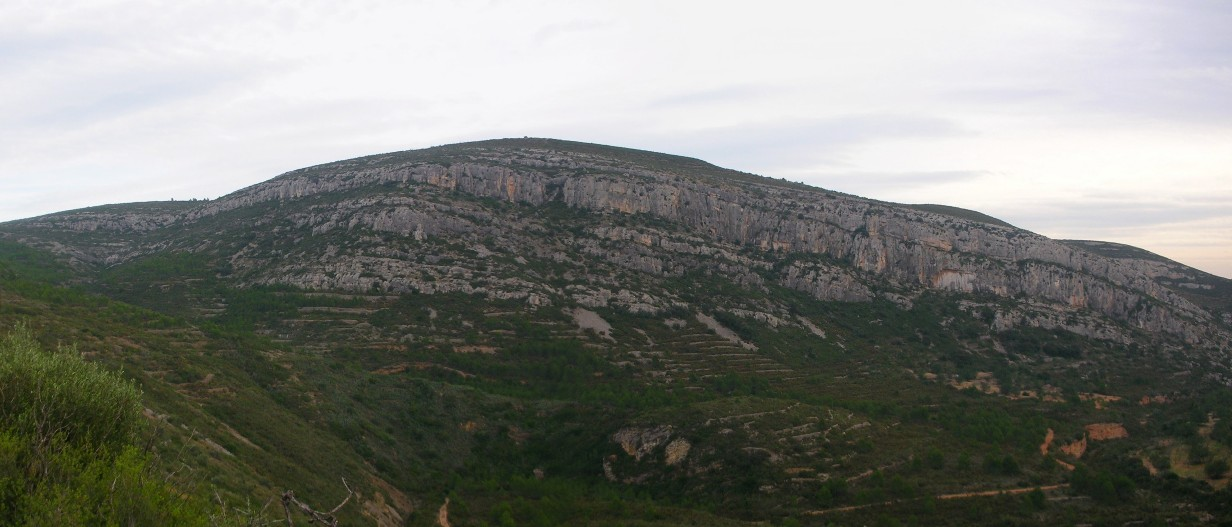
- Cliffs at the southern end of the Talaies range

Highest point
- Peak: Talaia Grossa
- Elevation: 635 m (2,083 ft)
- Listing: List of mountains in the Valencian Community
- Coordinates: 40°23′00″N 0°16′45″E

Dimensions
- Length: 27 km (17 mi) NE/SW
- Width: 8 km (5.0 mi) NW/SE

Geography
- Location within Spain
- Location: Baix Maestrat, Valencian Community
- Country: Spain
- Parent range: Mediterranean System, Southern zone

Geology
- Mountain type: karstic

Climbing
- First ascent: Unknown
- Easiest route: drive from Alcalà de Xivert or Santa Magdalena de Polpís

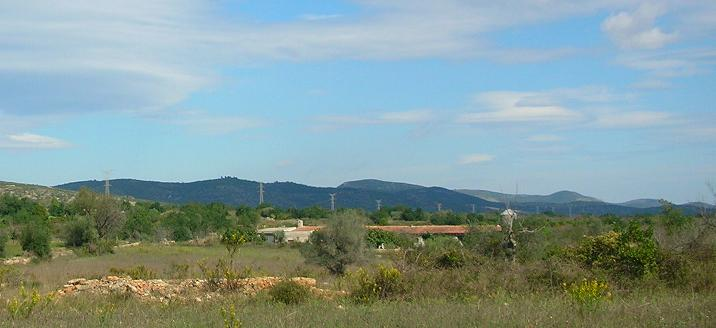
View of the Talaies north of Alcalà the Xivert

Talaies d'Alcalà (Valencian pronunciation: [taˈlajez ðalkaˈla], Spanish: Atalayas de Alcalá), also known as Serra de les Talaies or simply Les Talaies, is a 21.5 km long mountain range in the Baix Maestrat comarca, Valencian Community, Spain. Its highest point is Talaia Grossa (635 m).

Talaies, the name of the range, means "watchtowers" in Catalan, which is derived from Arabic, and refers to ancient battles fought in the area since Iberian times. Alcalà refers to the town of Alcalà de Xivert located in the plain below the mountains.

== Description ==
The Talaies range stretches a few kilometres inland parallel to the Serra d'Irta and the Mediterranean coastline in a NE–SW direction south of the Vinaròs plain, its northern limit. It rises on the western side of the road between Barcelona and Valencia. It stretches over the municipal terms of Santa Magdalena de Polpís, Cervera del Maestrat, La Salzadella and Les Coves de Vinromà in the west. Its southern limit is within Alcalà de Xivert municipal term. The Serra de la Vall d'Àngel mountains form a natural boundary further inland at the northwestern end of the Talaies.

The range is covered with low Mediterranean forest and Maquis shrubland. Parts of the lower slopes are planted with olive, almond and carob trees. Generally the eastern side of the range has more vegetation than the western owing to the influence of the sea breeze.

Geologically the Talaies d'Alcalà is a karstic formation with numerous shafts and caves. It is a southern prolongation of the Catalan Pre-Coastal Range that formed 25 million years ago as part of the Alpine orogeny. Geologically the section formed by the Talaies d'Alcalà – Santa Magdalena de Polpís/Alcalà de Xivert Valley – Serra d'Irta is very similar to the section formed by the Serra del Montsià – Ulldecona/Freginals Valley – Serra de Godall further north. These sets of parallel mountain ranges and valleys form the transition between the Mediterranean System and the Iberian System.

== History ==
This mountain range was the scenario of violent battles both during the Third Carlist War (1872–76) in the 19th century and again during the Spanish Civil War (1936 – 1939) when rebel faction troops tried to split the Spanish Republican government territory in two and reach the Mediterranean coast cutting across the Talaies.

== See also ==
- Maestrat/Maestrazgo
- Mountains of the Valencian Community
