= Serra de la Vall d'àngel =

Serra de la Valldàngel
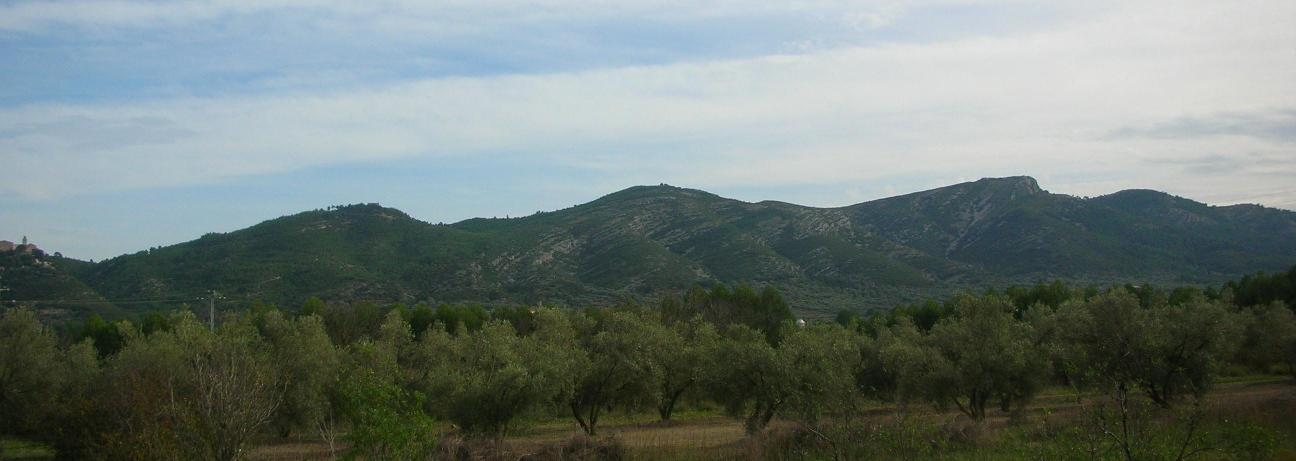
- Northern end of the western slopes close to Sant Mateu. The Ermita de la Mare de Déu dels Àngels can be seen on top of the summit on the left

Highest point
- Elevation: 715 m (2,346 ft)
- Listing: List of mountains in the Valencian Community
- Coordinates: 40°24′45″N 0°12′05″E

Geography
- Location within Spain
- Location: Baix Maestrat, Valencian Community
- Parent range: Iberian System, easternmost zone Mediterranean System, Southern zone

Geology
- Mountain type: Limestone

Climbing
- First ascent: Unknown
- Easiest route: drive from Sant Mateu or La Salzadella, then hike

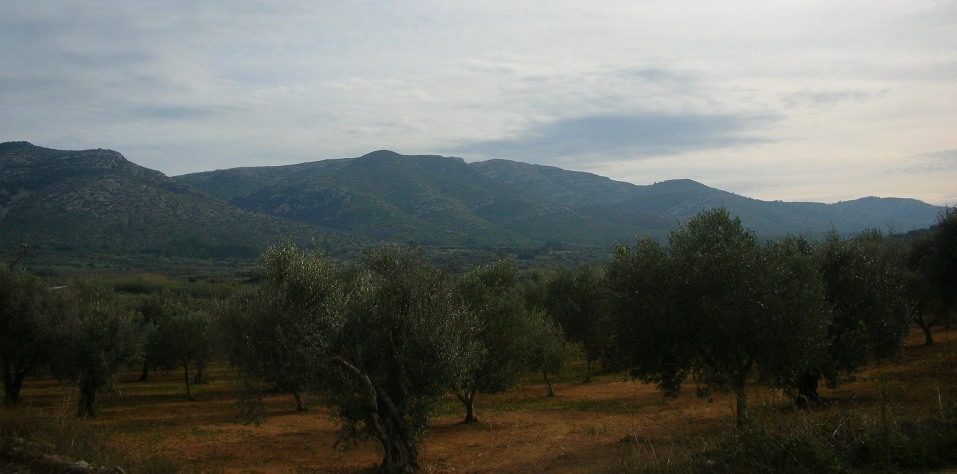
View of the central section of the Serra de la Valldàngel with its highest point, 715 m high Tossal d'en Canes, roughly in the middle of the picture

Serra de la Valldàngel or Serra de la Vall d'Àngel, (Spanish: Sierra de la Valdancha, also known as Sierra de Valdancha), is a mountain range in the Baix Maestrat comarca, Castellón Province, Valencian Community, Spain.

Its highest summit is Tossal d'en Canes (715 m), being slightly higher than neighboring Talaies d'Alcalà's highest summit. Another important peak is 520 m high El Cavall.

The range is named "Valley of the Angel" after the Ermita de la Mare de Déu dels Àngels de Sant Mateu, a church on a hill dedicated to the Virgin Mary of the angels. Its southern and southeastern limit is within Alcalà de Xivert's municipal term. The Talaies d'Alcalà mountains form a natural boundary at the southeastern end of the range.

== Description ==
The range stretches inland in a NE - SW direction east of Sant Mateu and La Salzadella. The intermittent river Rambla d'Alcalà has its origin in the Serra de la Vall d'Àngel. The range is covered with low Mediterranean forest and Maquis shrubland. Parts of the lower slopes are planted with olive, almond and carob trees.

Geologically the Serra de la Valldàngel belongs to the Iberian System, being part of the system's easternmost foothills, but its NE - SW orientation is clearly that of the Catalan Mediterranean System.

== History ==
The Ermita de la Mare de Déu dels Àngels was built in the 17th century. It is one of the most important landmarks of neighboring Sant Mateu town.

This mountain range was the scenario of violent battles both during the Third Carlist War (1872–76) in the 19th century and again in 1938 during the Spanish Civil War when rebel faction troops, after splitting the Spanish Republican government territory in two, tried in vain to reach Valencia, for the practically defeated Republican army opposed ferocious resistance in these mountains. The war would, however, be over just a few months later.

== See also ==
- Maestrat/Maestrazgo
- Mountains of the Valencian Community
