= Cervera Mountains =

Mountain range in Valencia, Spain

- Muntanyes de Cervera
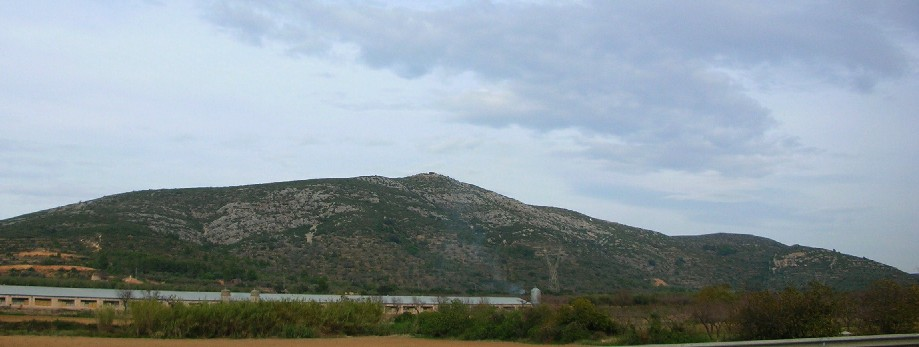
- Cervera Mountains. View from the north.

Highest point
- Peak: Revoltons
- Elevation: 635 m (2,083 ft)
- Listing: Mountains of the Valencian Community
- Coordinates: 40°28′54″N 0°16′34″E

Geography
- Location within Spain
- Location: Baix Maestrat, Valencian Community
- Region: ES (ES-CT)
- Parent range: Mediterranean System, Southern zone

Geology
- Orogeny: Alpine orogeny
- Rock type: Karstic

Climbing
- Easiest route: drive from La Jana or Traiguera

The Cervera Mountains (Valencian: Muntanyes de Cervera) is an 18.8 km (12 mi) long mountain range in the Baix Maestrat comarca, Valencian Community, Spain. In some ancient texts these mountains are known as Serra d'en Menor. Its highest point is Revoltons, 635 m (2,083 ft). Other notable summits are Perdiguera, 516 m (1,693 ft) and Mola, 481 m (1,578 ft).

== Location ==
The Cervera Mountains rise north of the Cervera del Maestrat town, south of Traiguera and east of La Jana. They are located in the transitional zone between the Mediterranean and the continental climate. In the winter the weather is colder than in the coastal mountain ranges and the summits are often covered in snow for a few days after each snowstorm.

The Our Lady of health shrine (Reial Santuari de Nostra Senyora de la Font de la Salut) which was first built in the 14th century is located on the eastern side of these mountains. The mountains are mostly covered with Mediterranean Maquis shrubland. There are some patches of pine forest.

== See also ==
- Mountains of the Valencian Community
- Maestrat/Maestrazgo
