= La Jana =

La Jana may refer to:

- La Jana, Spain, a municipality in the comarca of Baix Maestrat, Valencian Community, Spain
- La Jana (actress), Austro-German dancer and actress
