= Sant Mateu =

- Municipality
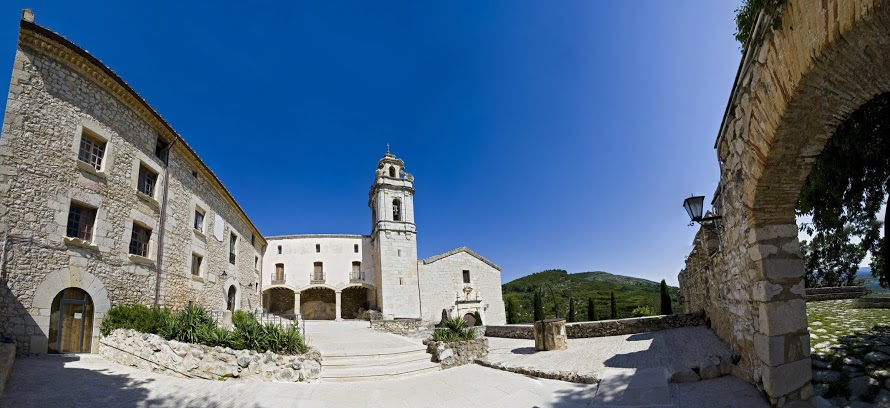

- Coat of arms

- Location in Spain
- Coordinates: 40°27′54″N 0°10′49″E
- Country: Spain
- Autonomous community: Valencian Community
- Province: Castelló
- Comarca: Baix Maestrat
- Judicial district: Vinaròs

Area
  - Total: 64.6 km^{2} (24.9 sq mi)
- Elevation: 325 m (1,066 ft)

Population (2025-01-01)
  - Total: 2,021
  - Density: 31.3/km^{2} (81.0/sq mi)
- Demonym(s): Santmatevà, santmatevana
- Time zone: UTC+1 (CET)
  - Summer (DST): UTC+2 (CEST)
- Postal code: 12170
- Official language(s): Valencian

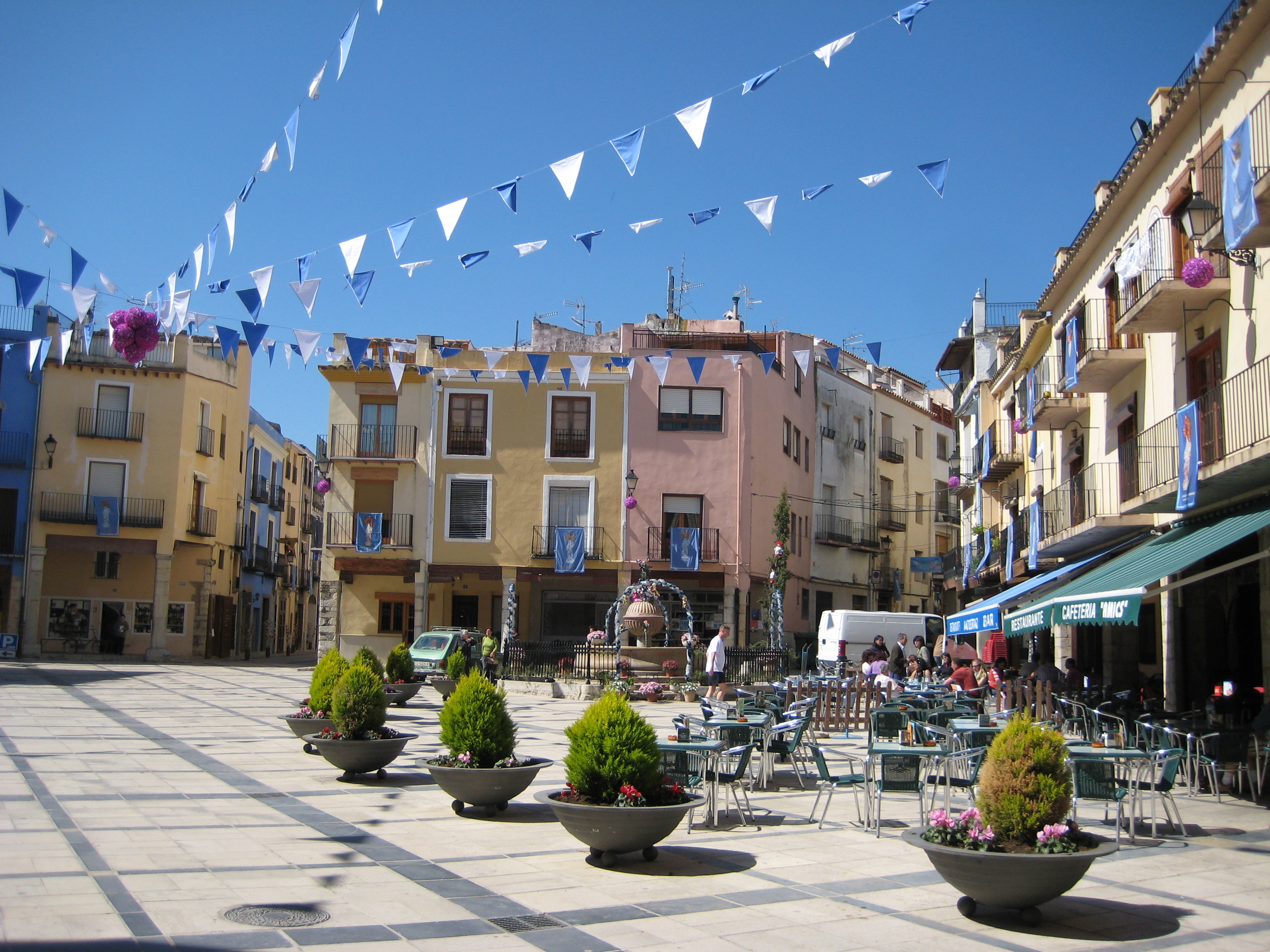
Main square in Sant Mateu.

Sant Mateu is a town and municipality in eastern Spain, in the province of Castellón, part of the autonomous community of Valencia.

Spanish/Mexican cartoonist and writer Sergio Aragonés was born here.

== Sights ==
The most interesting sights in Sant Mateu are:

- Església arxiprestal church building.
- Ermita de la Mare de Déu dels Àngels de Sant Mateu located in the Serra de la Vall d'Àngel mountain range east of the town.
