= Alto del Buitre =

Mountain in Spain

- Location within Spain

Highest point
- Elevation: 1,146 m (3,760 ft)
- Listing: List of mountains in the Valencian Community
- Coordinates: 38°59′18″N 0°56′15″W

Geography
- Location: Cofrentes Valley (Valencian Community)
- Parent range: Sierra Palomera, Sistema Ibérico

Climbing
- First ascent: Unknown
- Easiest route: From Ayora

Alto del Buitre is a mountain of the Sierra Palomera range, Valencian Community, Spain. It reaches an elevation of 1,146.25 metres (3,760.7 ft) above sea level. There is a triangulation station at the top marked "5195".

It is located within the Ayora municipal term, rising 15 km SE of the town. The summit offers a good view of the surrounding landscape and is popular with hikers.

There were fierce combats in the area of the Alto del Buitre in 1938 during the Levante Offensive of the Spanish Civil War.

There are mountains named "Alto del Buitre" in Colombia and in Chile as well. The name means "High Place of the Vulture" in Spanish.

== See also ==
- Mountains of the Valencian Community
