= Serra Calderona =

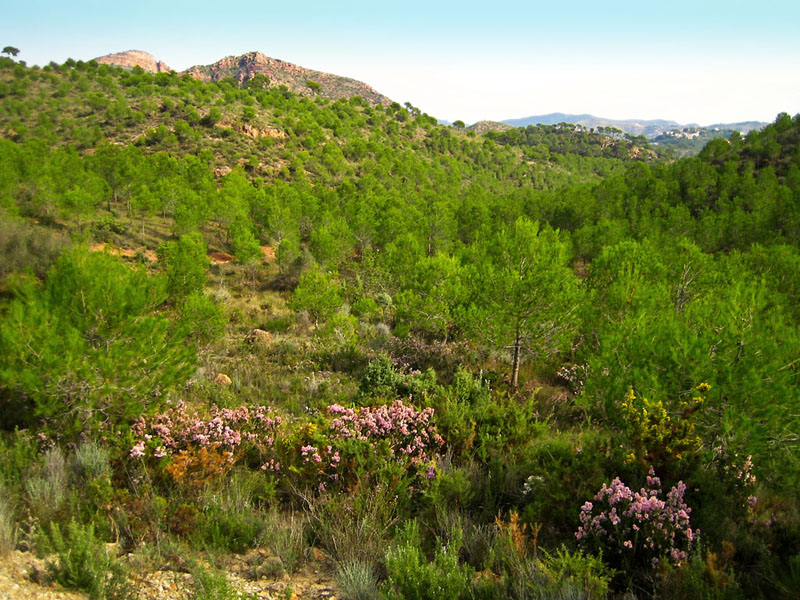
- Landscape in the heart of the Calderona Range

Highest point
- Elevation: 907 m (2,976 ft)
- Listing: List of mountains in the Valencian Community
- Coordinates: 39°43′45″N 0°29′34″W

Geography
- Location within Spain
- Location: Alt Palància, Camp de Túria, Horta Nord, Valencian Community
- Parent range: Iberian System, Eastern end

Geology
- Mountain type: Karstic

Climbing
- Easiest route: Drive from Puçol to Nàquera, then hike

Serra Calderona (Valencian pronunciation: [ˈsɛra kaldeˈɾona]; Spanish: Sierra Calderona), often referred to as La Calderona is a 49 km (30 mi) long mountain range in the Camp de Túria, Horta Nord and Alt Palància comarcas of the Valencian Community, between the provinces of Castelló and Valencia Spain.

This moderately high range is an eastern prolongation of the Sierra de Javalambre. Its highest point is El Gorgo (907 m). Other important summits are Muntanya del Garbí (600 m) and El Puntal de l' Abella (635 m).

The range was formerly known as Monts de Porta Coeli, after the Carthusian Monastery of Porta Coeli located in the mountains. The name Calderona originated in the seventeenth century when a woman known as María Calderón "La Calderona", one of the favourite mistresses of King Philip IV of Spain, hid in these mountains among the highwaymen.

== Olive oil Protected Designation of Origin (PDO) ==
Together with Serra d'Espadà, a parallel range only 25 km to the north, the Serra Calderona constitutes a defined ecoregion in the foothills of the Iberian System that are closest to the Mediterranean Sea coast. In many areas of the mountainsides olive trees are grown. Their olives produce excellent oil that has been awarded Protected Designation of Origin (PDO) and has been included by the global slow food movement in the Ark of Taste international catalogue of heritage foods in danger of extinction. This oil is marketed as Aceite de las Sierras Espadán y Calderona (Valencian: Oli de les Serres d'Espadà i la Calderona).

== Natural Park ==
There are numerous caves in these mountains, as well as deep river gorges. Formerly these mountains were a fearful place for travellers, for they were haunted by bandits or highwaymen, known locally as roders. The Natural Park of the Calderona Range is located in the Serra Calderona. Within this well-kept park there are numerous marked paths for hikers.

== Features ==
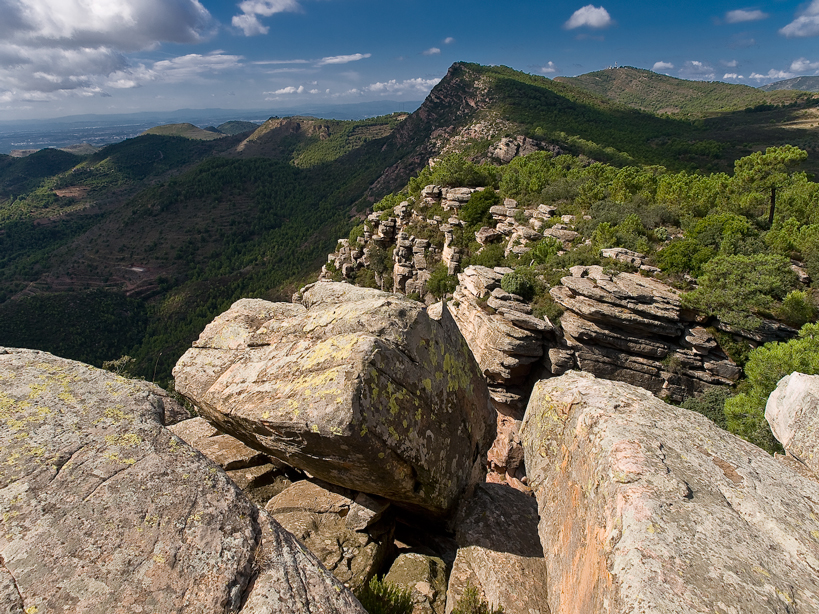
The rocky 600 m high Muntanya del Garbí

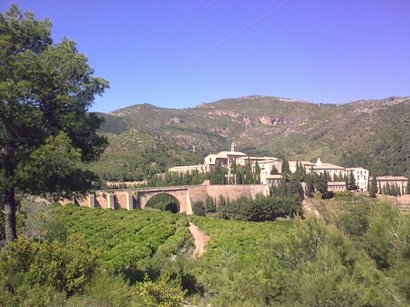
The Porta Coeli Carthusian monastery

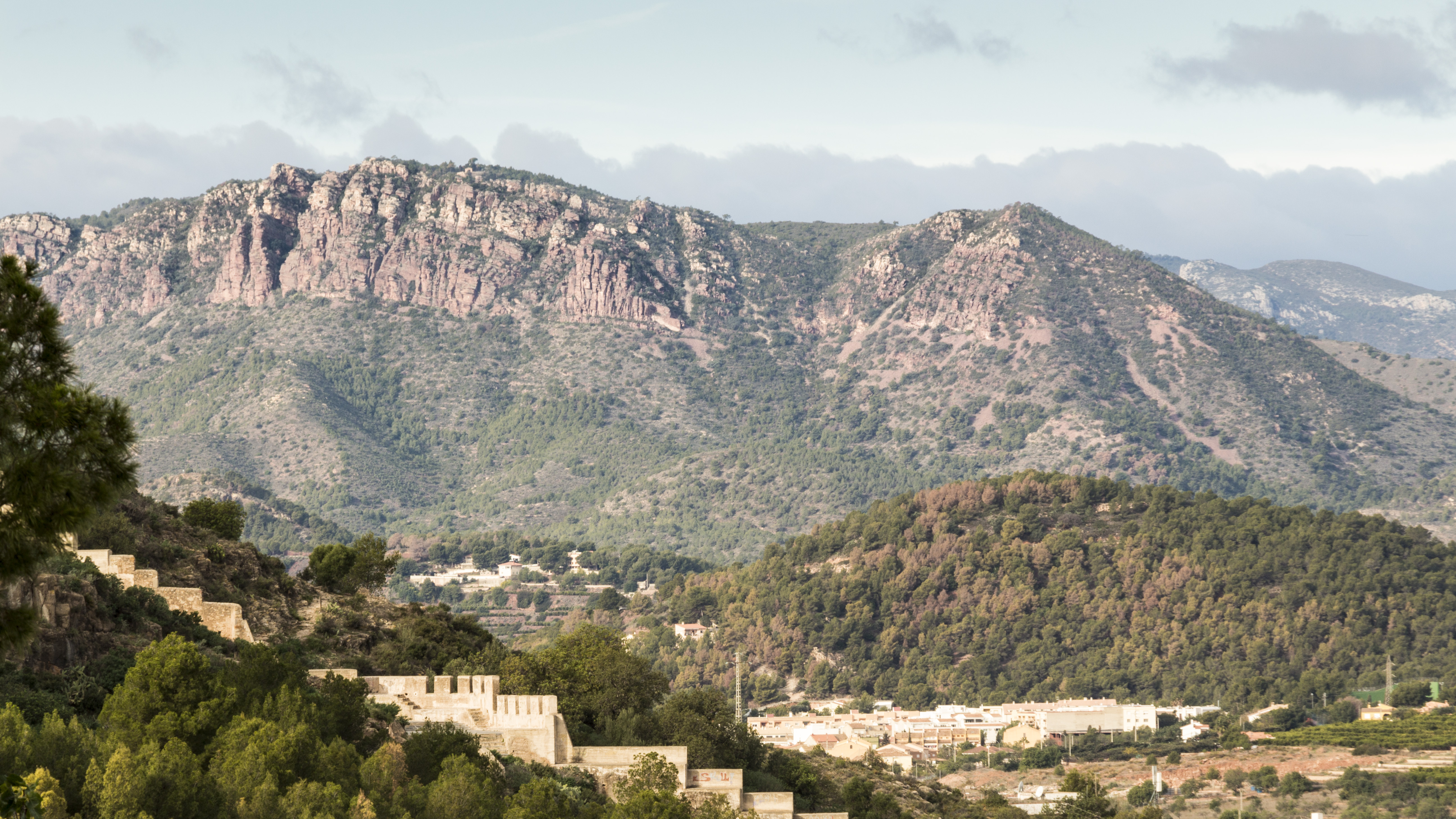
Serra Calderona (Sagunto)

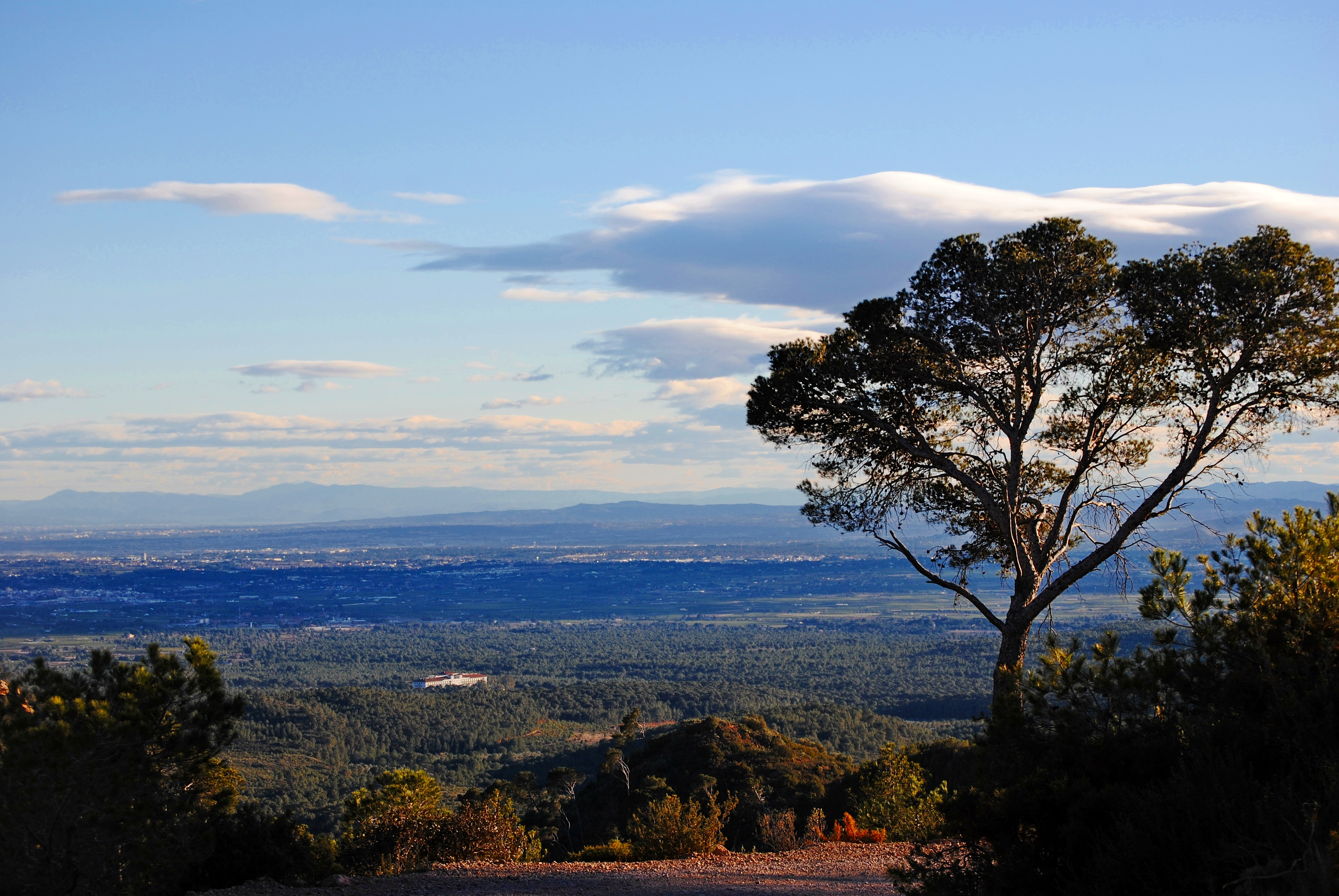
General view

== See also ==
- Sagunto Castle
- Serra d'Espadà
- Mountains of the Valencian Community
