= Sierra del Toro =

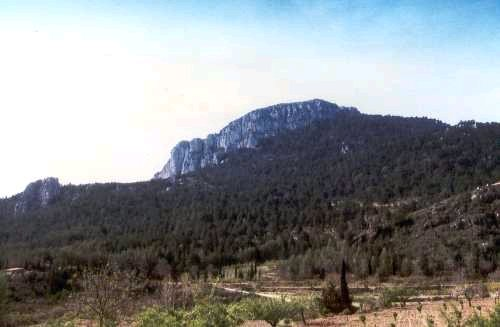
- Peñaescabia or Penya d'Escàbia (1 326 m)

Highest point
- Elevation: 1,616 m (5,302 ft)
- Listing: List of mountains in the Valencian Community
- Coordinates: 39°56′41″N 0°47′47″W

Geography
- Location within Spain
- Location: Alt Palància, Valencian Community; Gúdar-Javalambre, Aragon
- Parent range: Iberian System, Eastern zone

Geology
- Mountain type: Karstic (Jurassic)

Climbing
- Easiest route: From the towns of El Toro, Manzanera, Abejuela, Barraques, Toràs, or Begís

Sierra del Toro (Valencian: Serra del Toro) is a 21 km (13 mi) long mountain range in the Alt Palància comarca, Valencian Community, close to the limit with Teruel Province, Aragon, Spain. It is named after the nearby town of El Toro.

== Location ==
This mountain range is located at the eastern end of the Iberian System and is a southern prolongation of the Sierra de Javalambre. Its highest point is Puntal del Agrillar (1,616 m). Other important peaks are Puntal de Magaña (1,614 metres), Alto del Tomatero (1,607 metres), Puntal de Peiró (1,605 metres) and Salada (1,581 metres), where there is a military communications compound. Its summits are usually covered in snow in the winter and are among the highest peaks of the Land of Valencia. Therefore, there are also numerous ancient ice houses.

These mountains have been often devastated by forest fires in hot and dry summers and extensive planting of trees has been undertaken.

This mountain range was the scenario of violent battles during the Spanish Civil War (1936–1939) when the fascist troops tried to split the Spanish Republican government territory in two and reach the Mediterranean coast and there are many remains of trenches.

== See also ==
- Mountains of the Valencian Community
- XYZ Line
