= Sierra Martés =

Geographical location

39°19′30.73″N 0°57′5.01″W

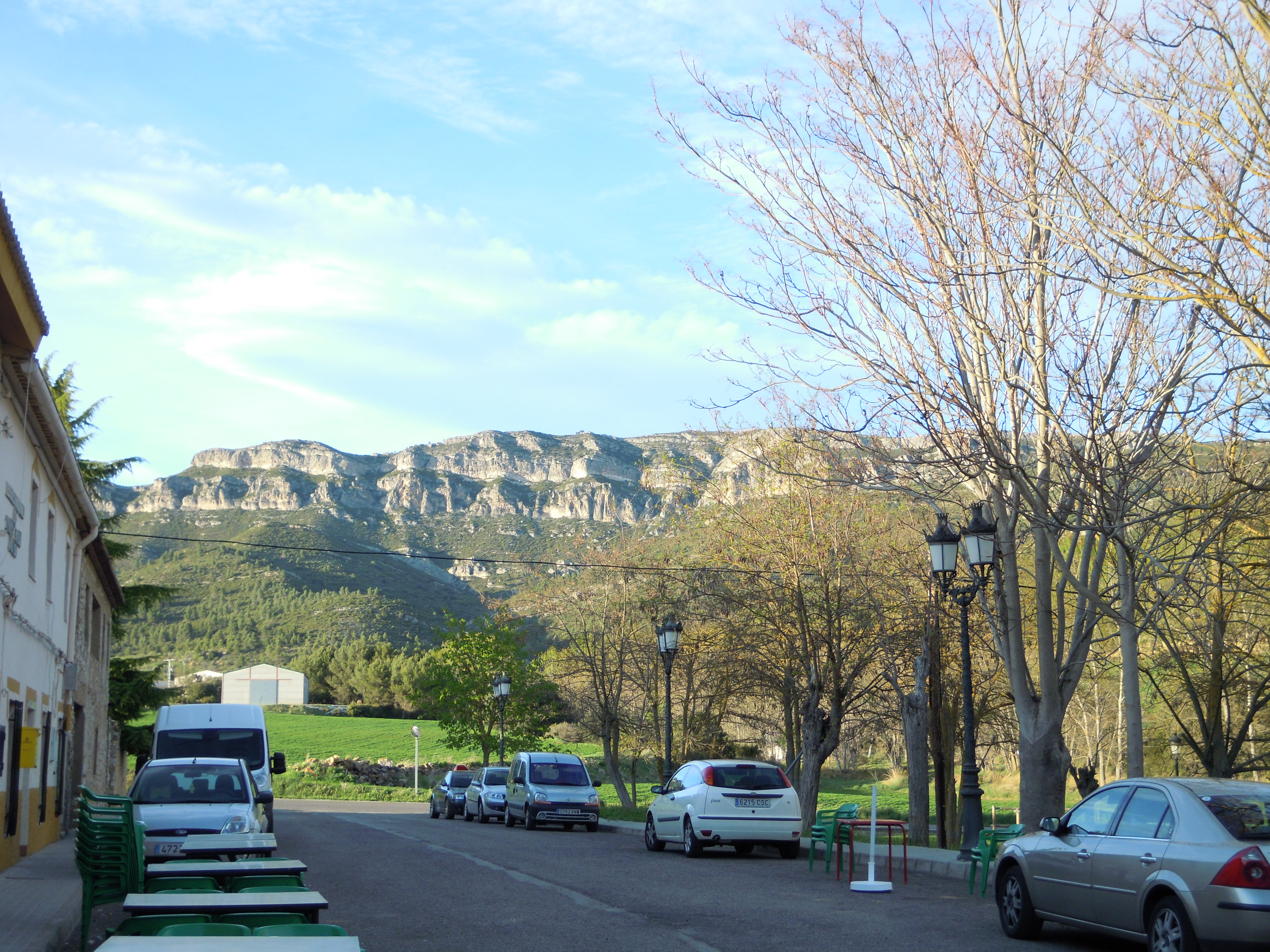

Sierra Martés or Sierra de Martés (Valencian Language: Serra de Martés) is a mountain range settled alongside the Valencian comarques of Requena-Utiel and Hoya de Buñol, province of Valencia (east Spain). Is one of the last Iberica formations, nowadays just there the Caroig's calcareous platform split by the Jucar River viaduct

Has border at south with Mola d'Albeitar and Venta Gaeta (the twice are Cortes de Pallás's village) in the east and along the length of Sierra del Ave, Dos Aguas and Caballón. In the north side there's the Forata's Reservoir and by the west, the range lows until reach the Requena's Altiplano where the topography are more flat than Forata.

Martés is protected by the Conselleria de Medio Ambiente de la Generalitat Valènciana (Valencian Government Environmental Council) and has a nature reserve with flora variety.
