= Penyagolosa =

Mountain in Spain

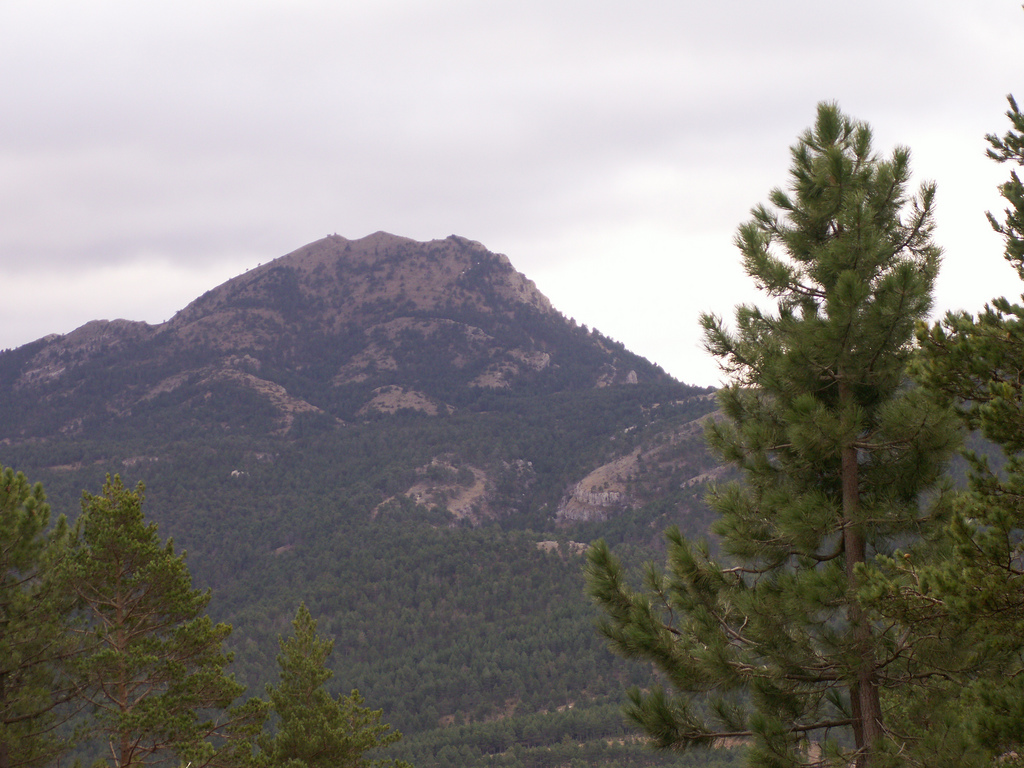
- Penyagolosa; north face

Highest point
- Elevation: 1,813 m (5,948 ft)
- Listing: List of mountains in the Valencian Community
- Coordinates: 40°13′33″N 00°20′57″W

Geography
- Location within Spain
- Location: Alcalatén (Valencian Community)
- Parent range: Iberian System

Climbing
- Easiest route: Drive from Vistabella del Maestrat

Penyagolosa (Valencian pronunciation: [ˌpeɲaɡoˈloza], Spanish: Peñagolosa) is a mountain in the Alcalatén area, Valencian Community, Spain. Geologically it is part of the Iberian System, located at the eastern end of Iberian Peninsula. Its peak is at 1,813 meters above sea level and is often crowned with snow in the winter.

The Penyagolosa is widely considered to be most emblematic mountain in the Valencian Community. Since it stands quite isolated, it was thought to be the highest peak in the region, but actually the highest is the 1,839 meter high Cerro Calderón, located in the Rincón de Ademuz, a Valencian exclave where there are three more peaks over 1,500 m.

At the base of the mountain is the important pilgrimage destination of Sant Joan de Penyagolosa.

== Penyagolosa Massif ==
The Penyagolosa Massif includes other minor mountain ranges, like the Sierra de la Batalla which stretches westward towards Aragon.

== See also ==
- List of mountains in the Valencian Community
- Maestrat or Maestrazgo
