= Sierra de Enguera =

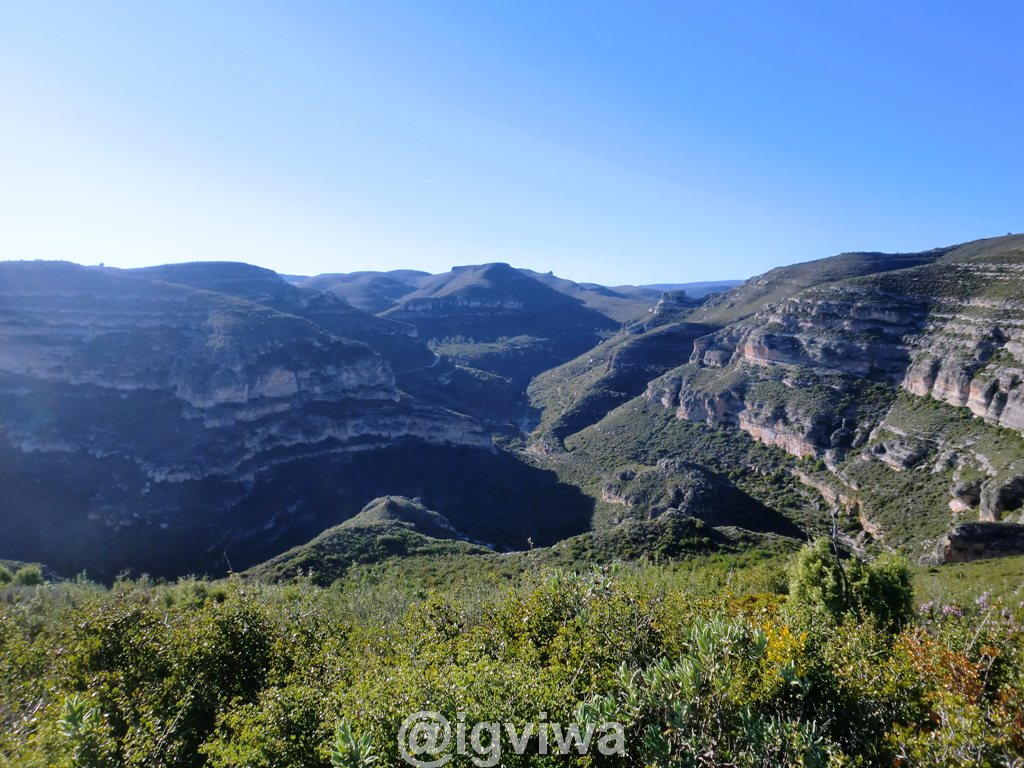
- Landscape in Sierra de Enguera

Highest point
- Elevation: 1,056 m (3,465 ft)
- Coordinates: 38°56′40″N 0°57′34″W

Geography
- Location within Spain
- Location: Canal de Navarrés and Valle de Cofrentes, Valencian Community
- Parent range: Prebaetic System, eastern end

Geology
- Mountain type: Karstic

Climbing
- Easiest route: Drive from Énguera, Ayora or Almansa, then hike

Sierra de Enguera (Valencian: Serra d'Énguera) is a 16.45 km (10 mi) long mountain range in the Canal de Navarrés and Valle de Cofrentes comarcas, Valencian Community, Spain. Its highest point is Altos de Salomón (1,056 m.) in the Caroig Massif. Other important peaks are Palmera (880 m.), Cova Negra (862 m.) and Marc (830 m.).

This mountain chain is named after the town of Énguera, located to the east of the range.

== See also ==
- Mountains of the Valencian Community
