= El Toro, Castellón =

El Toro
- Municipality
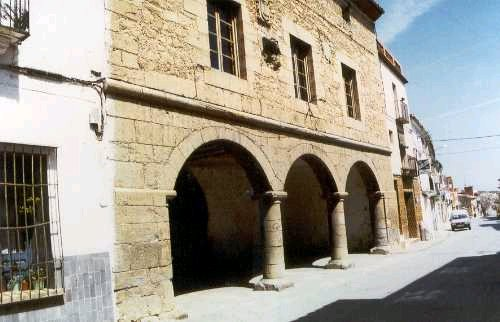
- El Toro's Town Hall.

- Coat of arms

- Location of El Toro. El Toro (Valencian Community)
- Coordinates: 39°59′N 0°45′W
- Country: Spain
- Community: Valencia
- Province: Castellón
- Comarca: Alto Palancia

Government
  - Mayor: José Arenes Vicente

Area
  - Total: 110.04 km^{2} (42.49 sq mi)

Population (2023)
  - Total: 248
  - Density: 2.25/km^{2} (5.84/sq mi)
- Demonym: Torano/a
- Time zone: UTC+1 (CET)
  - Summer (DST): UTC+2 (CEST)
- Postal code: 12429
- Website: www.eltoro.es

El Toro is a municipality in the comarca of Alto Palancia, Castellón, Valencia, Spain.

The Sierra del Toro mountain range is named after this town.
