= La Jana, Spain =

La Jana
- Municipality
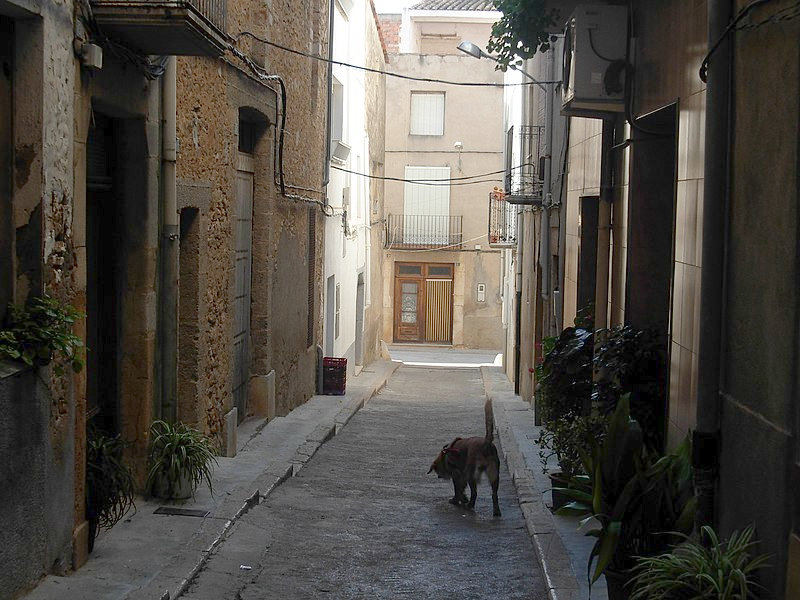

- Coat of arms

- Location in Spain
- Coordinates: 40°30′46″N 0°15′10″E
- Country: Spain
- Autonomous community: Valencian Community
- Province: Castelló
- Comarca: Baix Maestrat
- Judicial district: Vinaròs

Area
  - Total: 19.5 km^{2} (7.5 sq mi)
- Elevation: 299 m (981 ft)

Population (2025-01-01)
  - Total: 679
  - Density: 34.8/km^{2} (90.2/sq mi)
- Demonym(s): Janenc, janenca
- Time zone: UTC+1 (CET)
  - Summer (DST): UTC+2 (CEST)
- Postal code: 12340
- Official language(s): Valencian

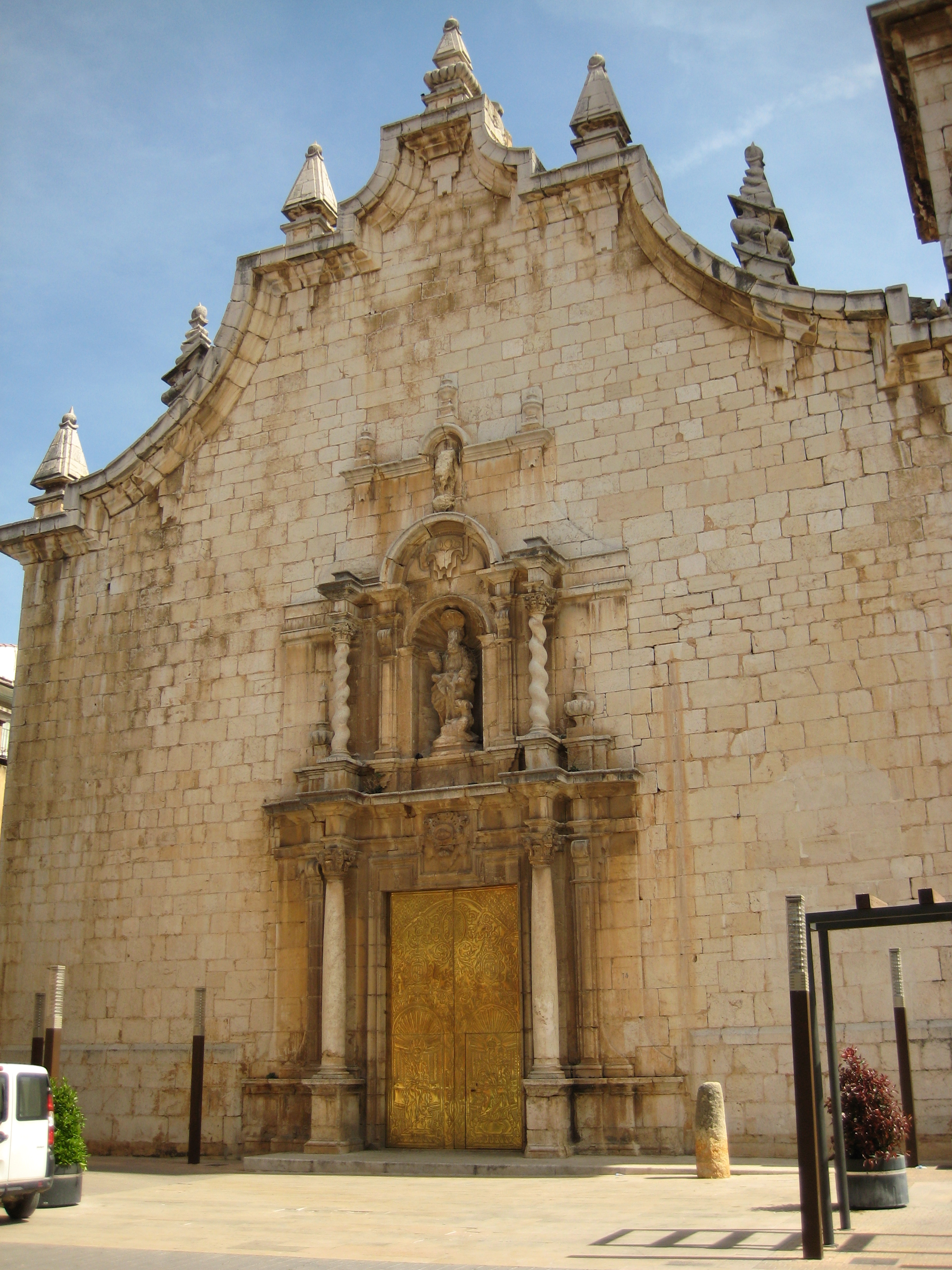
Main church façade. La Jana

La Jana is a municipality in the comarca of Baix Maestrat in the Valencian Community, Spain. The Cervera Mountains rise just east of the town extending southwards.

It is an agricultural town located west of the Muntanyes de Cervera surrounded by cultivated plots, mainly almond, carob and olive trees, as well as some cereal fields. La Jana is part of the Taula del Sénia free association of municipalities.
