= Serra d'Espadà =

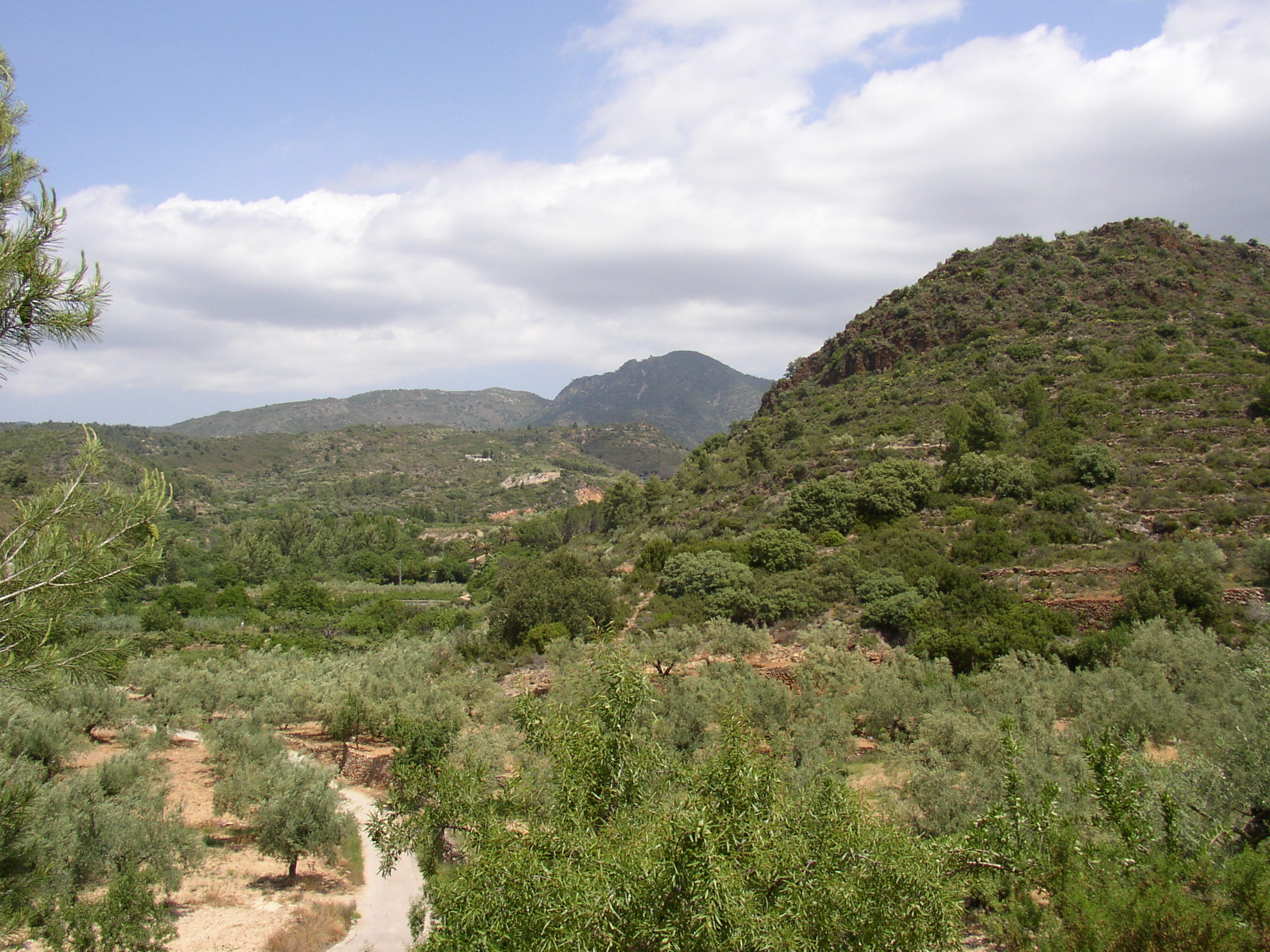
- La Vall d'Almonesir, in the heart of the Range

Highest point
- Elevation: 1,106 m (3,629 ft)
- Listing: List of mountains in the Valencian Community
- Coordinates: 39°52′00″N 0°17′30″W

Geography
- Location within Spain
- Location: Alt Palància, Alt Millars, Plana Baixa, Valencian Community
- Parent range: Iberian System, Eastern end

Geology
- Mountain type: Buntsandstein

Climbing
- Easiest route: First drive from Sogorb, then hike from Eslida

Serra d'Espadà (Valencian pronunciation: [ˈsɛra ðespaˈða], Spanish: Sierra de Espadán) is a 51 km (32 mi) long mountain range in the Alt Palància, Alt Millars and Plana Baixa comarcas, in the Province of Castellón, Valencian Community, Spain. Its highest point is La Ràpita (1,106 m).

Road N-234 winds its way between the Serra d'Espadà and Sierra de Javalambre reaching the coast at Sagunto and the Autopista AP-7.

== Olive Oil Protected Designation of Origin (PDO) ==
Together with Serra Calderona, a parallel range only 25 km to the south, the Serra d'Espadà constitutes a defined ecoregion in the foothills of the Iberian System that are closest to the Mediterranean Sea coast. In many areas of the mountainsides olive trees are grown. Their olives produce excellent oil that has been awarded Protected Designation of Origin (PDO) and has been included by the global Slow Food movement in the Ark of Taste international catalogue of heritage foods in danger of extinction. This oil is marketed as Aceite de las Sierras Espadán y Calderona (Valencian: Oli de les Serres d'Espadà i la Calderona).

== Natural Park ==
There are also Cork Oak forests in these mountains, as well as springs and shady ravines. The Serra d'Espadà Natural Park is located in this range. Within this well-kept park there are numerous marked paths for hikers.

== Features ==
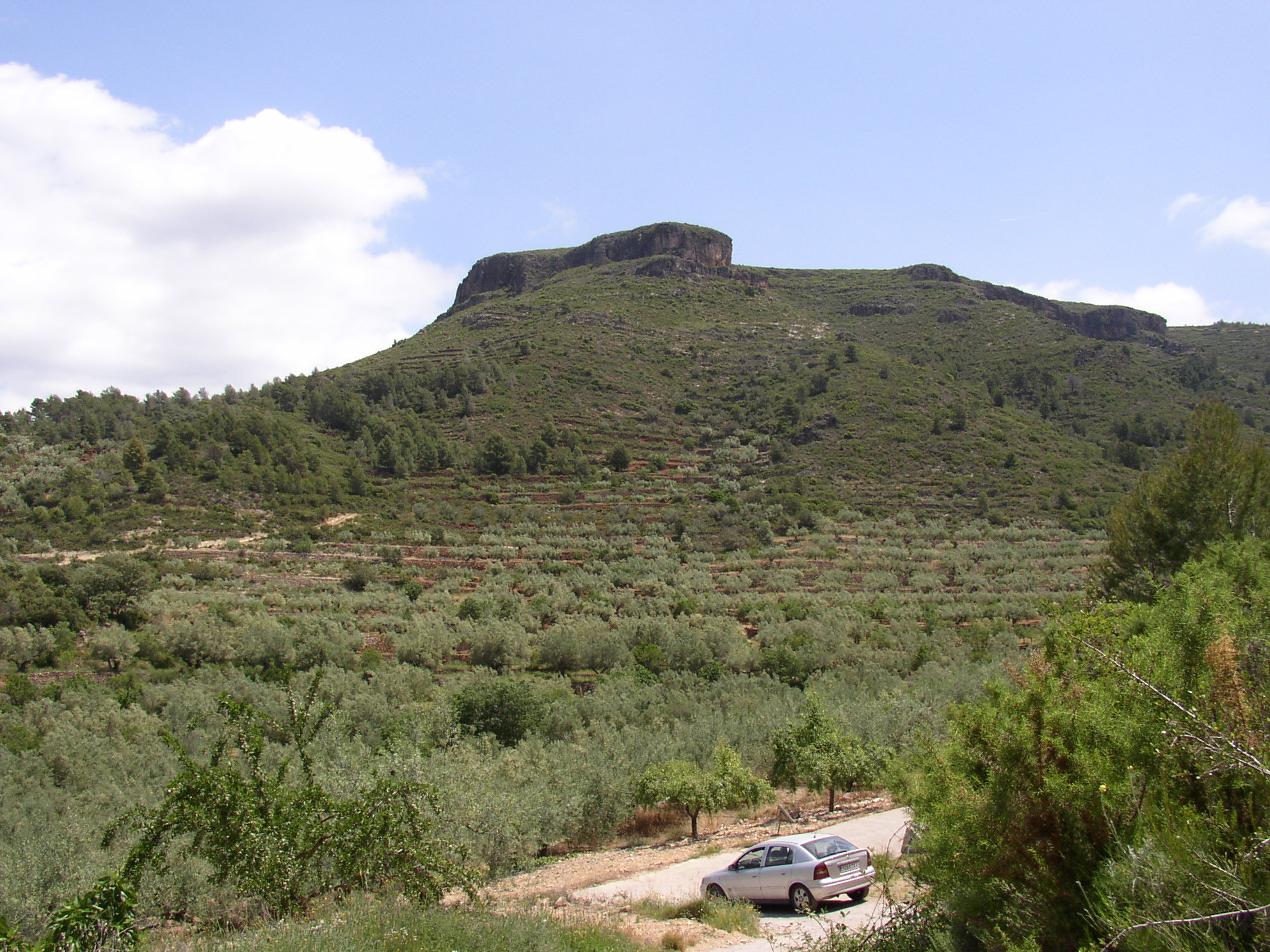
Matorramos Rock in the Serra d'Espadà rising behind olive tree fields

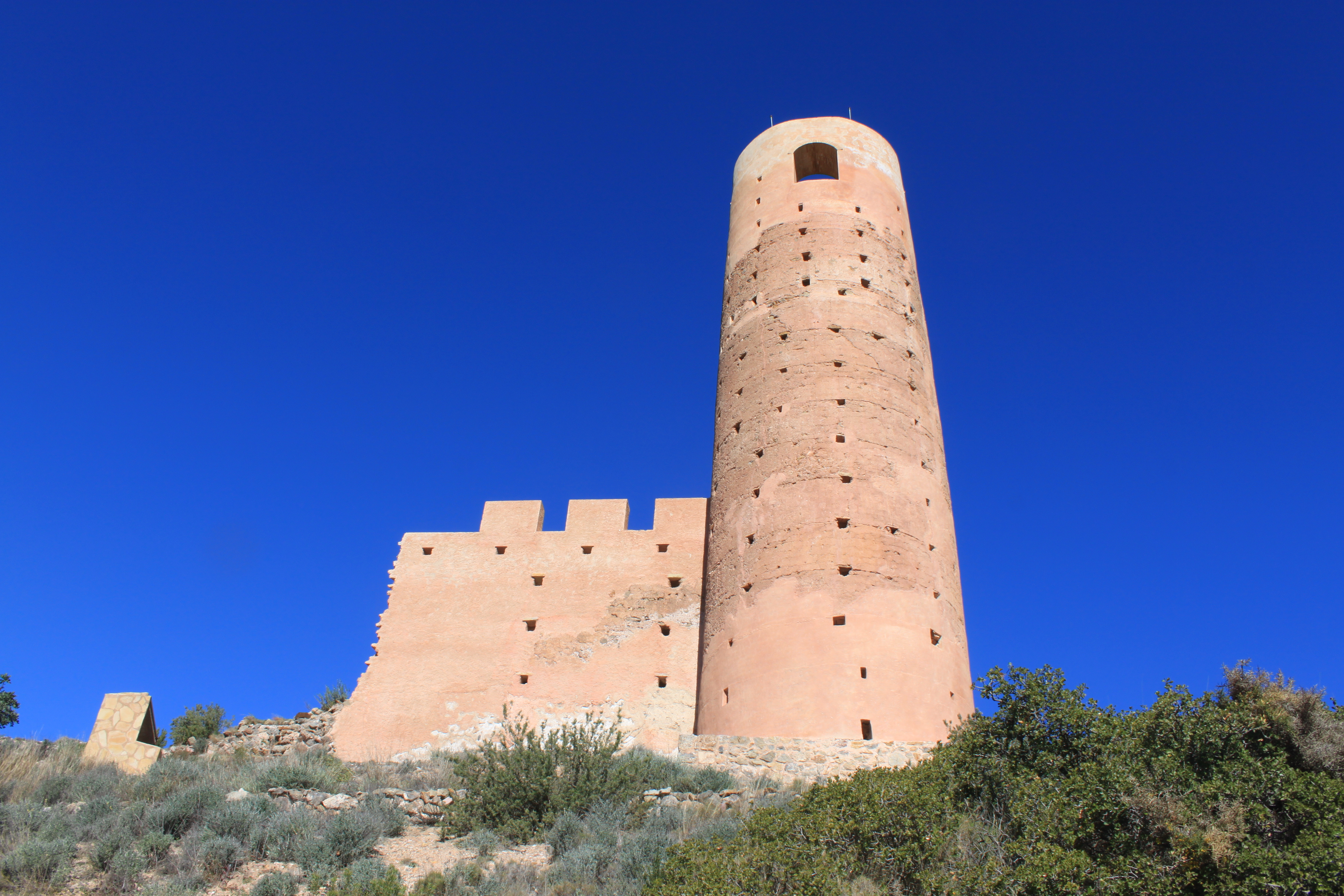
Almonesir/Almonacid Castle

== See also ==
- Serra Calderona
- Mountains of the Valencian Community
- XYZ Line
