= Sierra de Javalambre =

Mountain in Spain

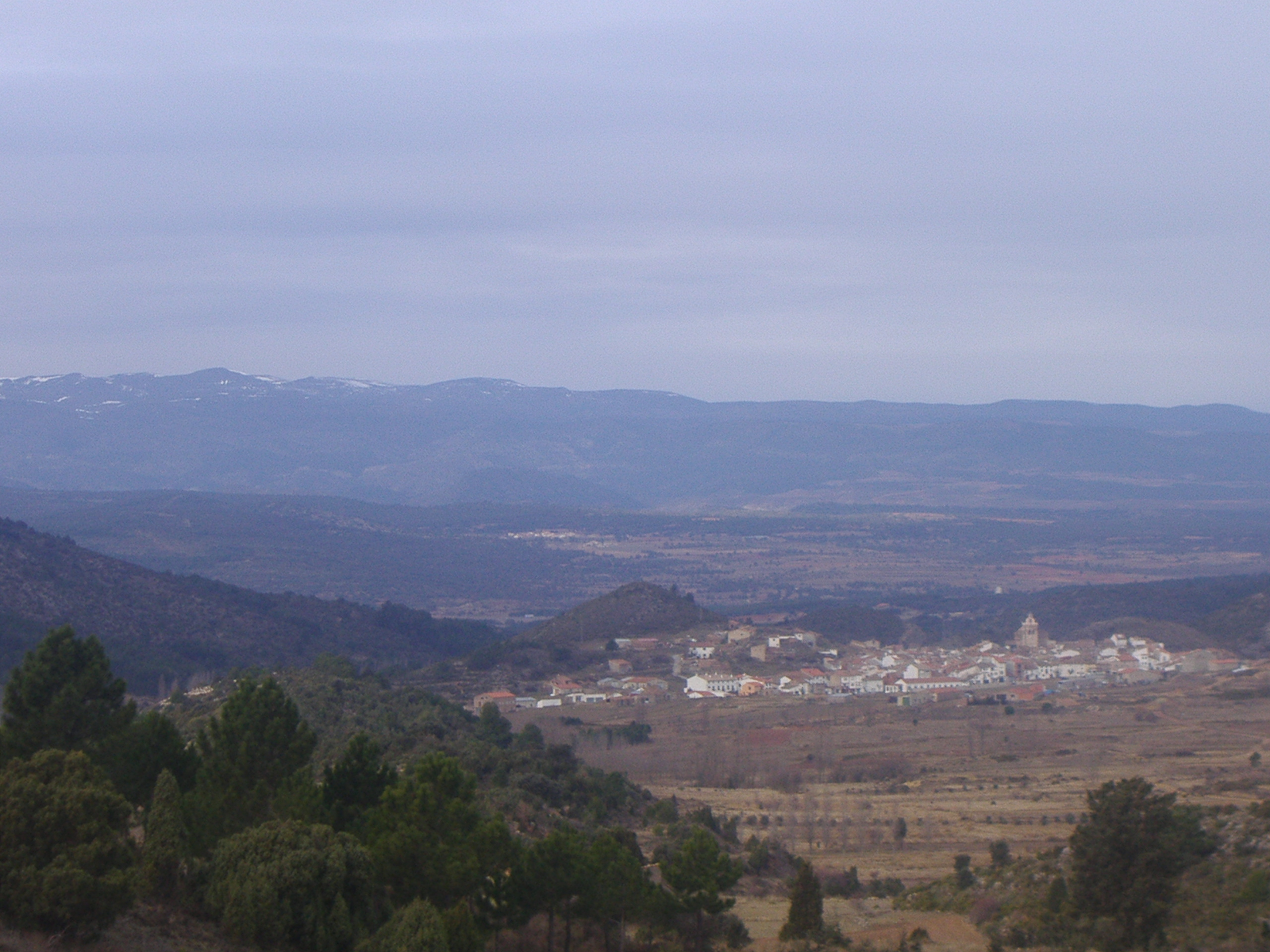
- Sierra de Javalambre rising above Pina

Highest point
- Elevation: 2,020 m (6,630 ft)
- Listing: Mountains of Aragon, List of mountains in the Valencian Community
- Coordinates: 40°5′49.7″N 1°1′29″W

Geography
- Location within Spain
- Location: Gúdar-Javalambre, Aragon; Rincón de Ademuz and Serrans, Valencian Community
- Parent range: Iberian System, Eastern zone

Geology
- Mountain type: Karstic (Jurassic)

Climbing
- Easiest route: From the towns of La Puebla de Valverde, Ademuz or Riodeva

Sierra de Javalambre (Aragonese: Sierra de Chabalambre; Arabic: جبل الْحَمْرَاء, romanized: jabal al-ḥamrāʼ)) is a 29 km (18 mi) long mountain range in the Gúdar-Javalambre comarca of Aragon and the Rincón de Ademuz and Serrans comarcas of the Valencian Community, Spain.

Highway N-234 winds its way between Sierra de Javalambre and Serra d'Espadà reaching the coast at Sagunto and the Autopista AP-7.

== Location ==
This mountain range is located at the eastern end of the Iberian System and the Sierra del Toro its ESE prolongation. Its highest point is Javalambre (2,020 m).

== Summits ==
Its summits are usually covered in snow in the winter and the 1,839 m high Cerro Calderón or Alto de las Barracas is the highest peak of the Land of Valencia. Aramón Javalambre is a small ski resort in the range with 12.2 km of ski trails. The Buitre summit hosts the Astrophysical Observatory of Javalambre.

== See also ==
- List of mountains in Aragon
- Mountains of the Valencian Community
