= Montegordo =

Mountain in Spain

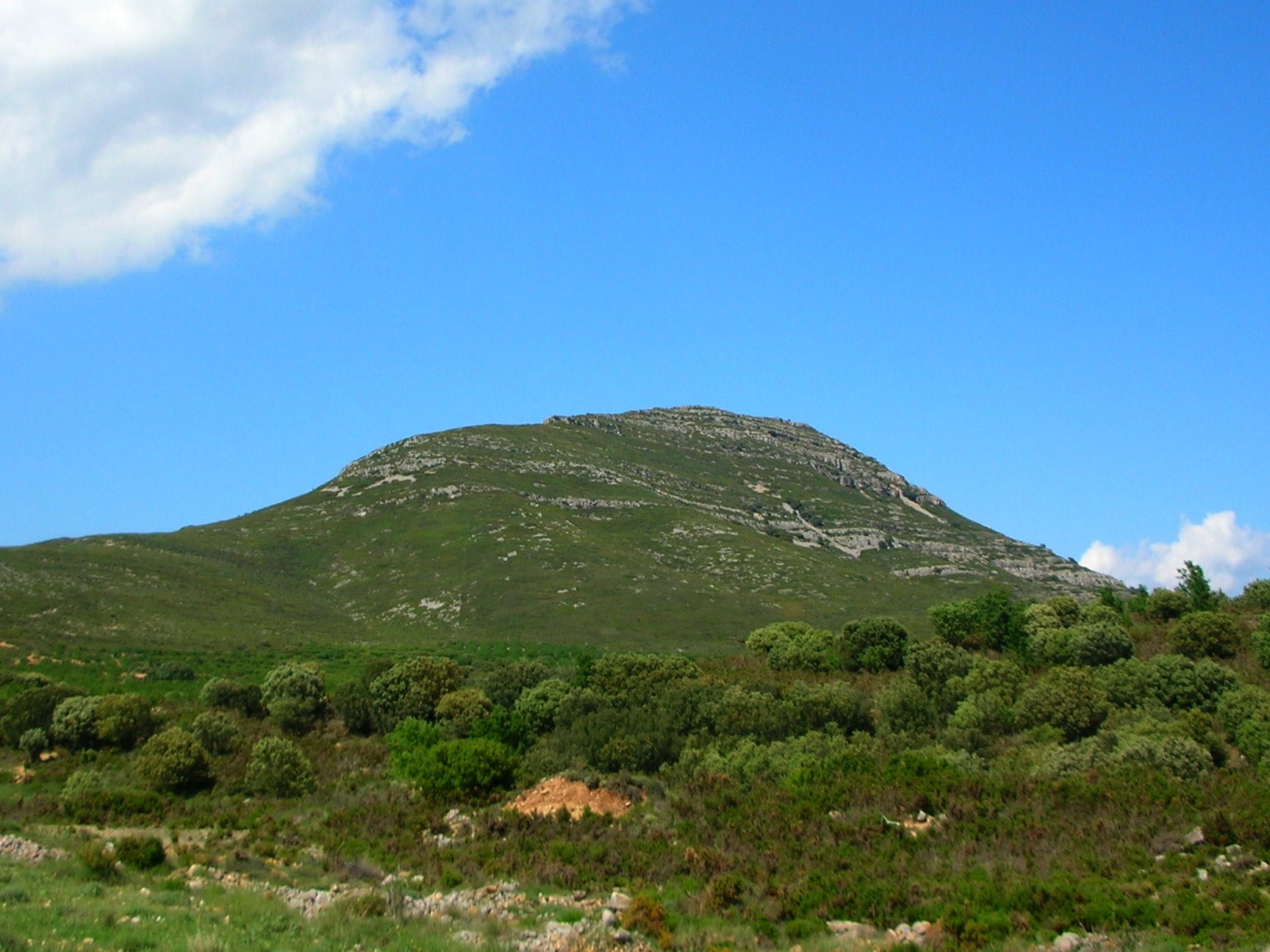

Highest point
- Elevation: 837 m (2,746 ft)
- Listing: Mountains of the Valencian Community
- Coordinates: 40°24′16″N 0°2′10″E

Geography
- Location within Spain
- Location: Alt Maestrat, Valencian Community

Climbing
- First ascent: Unknown
- Easiest route: From Albocàsser

Montegordo is a mountain forming part of the eastern end of the Iberian System, Valencian Community, Spain. It is located near Albocàsser and its altitude is 837 metres (2,746 ft). The Barranc de la Valltorta gorge is located close by.

La Coveta is a cave on the side of the mountain with prehistoric cave paintings.

== See also ==
- Mountains of the Valencian Community
- Serra d'En Celler, a mountain range nearby
