= Catalan Mediterranean System =

Geographical region in Catalonia

Coordinates: 41°41′21.56″N 2°34′39.6″E

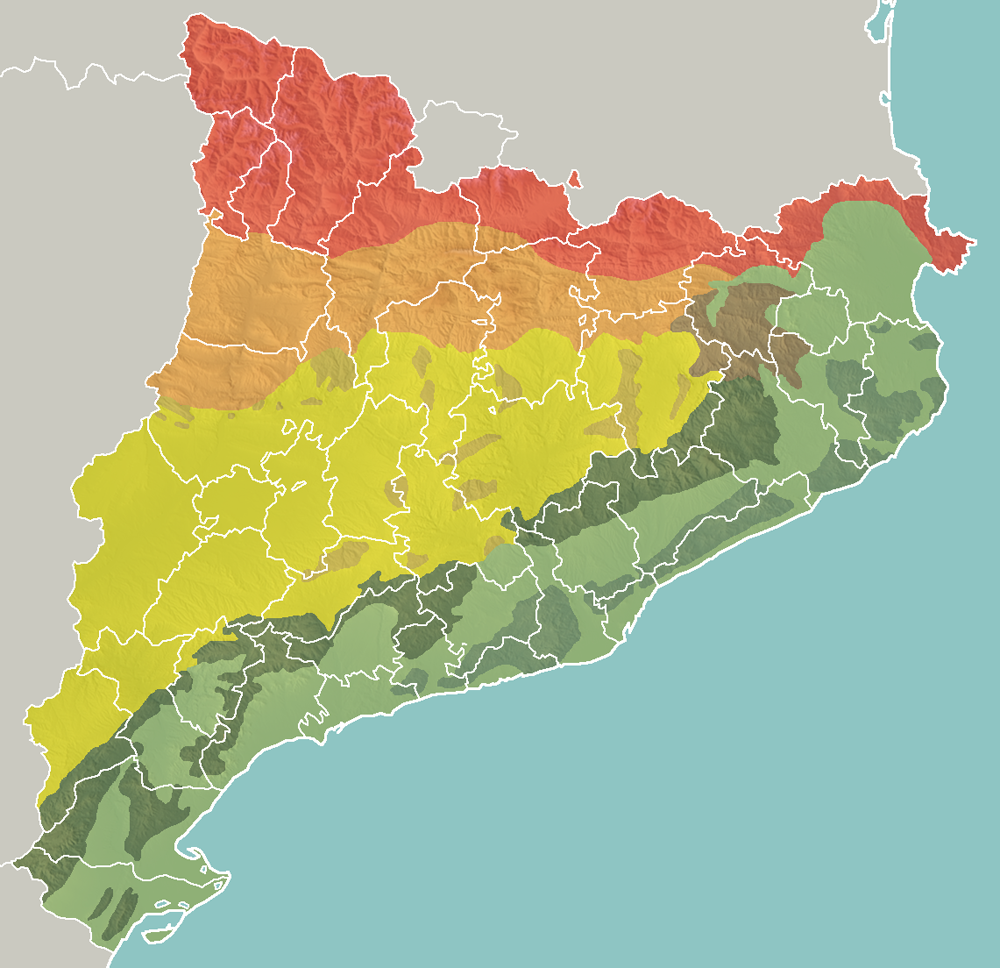
Geomorphologic map of Catalonia (The green Southern Zone extends 80 km further south into the Valencian community): Pyrenees; Pre-Pyrenees; Catalan Central Depression; Smaller mountain ranges of the Central Depression; Catalan Transversal Range; Catalan Pre-Coastal Range; Catalan Coastal Range; Catalan Coastal Depression and other coastal and pre-coastal plains

The Catalan Mediterranean System, also known as Mediterranean System, Transversal Ibero-Pyrenaean System, and Catalanid System, is a wide coastal geographical region in Catalonia. It is made up of a double system of coastal mountain chains: The Catalan Coastal Range and the Catalan Pre-Coastal Range, as well as the Catalan Coastal Depression and other coastal and pre-coastal plains located among those mountain ranges.

== Geology ==
Geologically the Catalan Mediterranean System is the result of a tectonic uplift, about 300 km long and roughly 50 km wide.

Transversally the system can be divided in three zones:

- Northern Zone, between the Empordà comarca and the Llobregat. This zone is of paleozoic and crystalline composition
- Central Zone, between rivers Llobregat and Ebre
- Southern Zone, between the Baix Ebre comarca and the Millars River in the Valencian Community. Both the central and the southern zone are of mesozoic and tertiary composition.

== See also ==
- Catalan Coastal Range
- Catalan Pre-Coastal Range
- Catalan Coastal Depression
