= Serra d'Irta Natural Park =

Coordinates: 40.278°N 0.326°E

- IUCN category V (protected landscape/seascape)
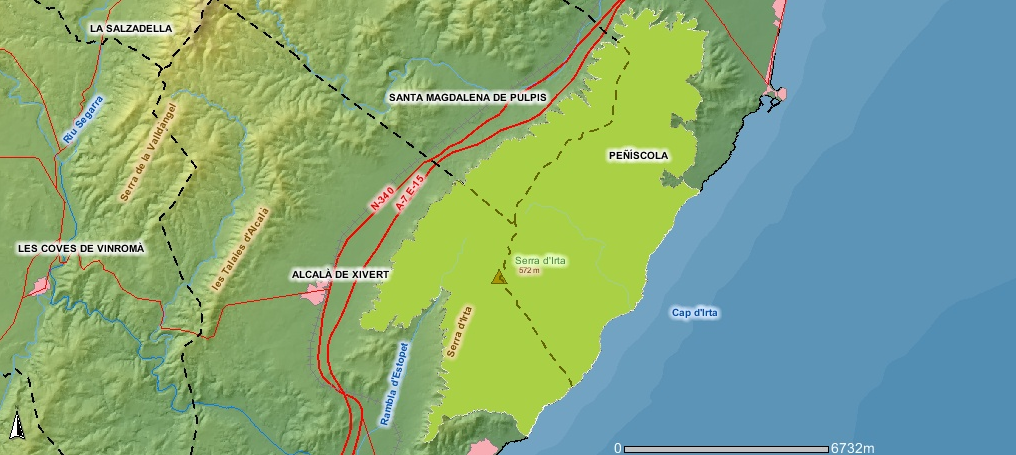
- Interactive map of Serra d'Irta Natural Park
- Location: Peniscola, Santa Magdalena de Polpís, Alcalà de Xivert (Province of Castellón, Valencian Community)
- Nearest city: Peniscola (15 mi) and Alcossebre (15 mi)
- Area: 7,744 ha (19,140 acres)
- Established: 2002
- Governing body: Generalitat Valenciana

Serra d'Irta Natural Park (Valencian: Parc Natural de la Serra d'Irta, Spanish: Parque Natural de la Sierra de Irta) is a natural park in Valencian Community), Southern Spain. It contains 7,744 hectares of land, as well as a shoreline of marine nature reserve of the adjacent Mediterranean Sea. It was declared a protected area in 2002.

The park protects the environment of large zones of the Serra d'Irta mountain range with the highest elevation being the pico Campanilles (or Campanella) at 572 metres, and the coastal area of the Costa del Azahar with the reefs of the marine reserve extending into the sea. The range runs parallel to the coast and forks in the south in an area separated by the Estopet valley. On the coastal side the mountains descend abruptly along 12 km with numerous cliffs, coves and cornices.

Large swathes of urbanized and touristic areas of the coastal side of Serra d'Irta located at the northern end near Peníscola, as well as at the southern end, near Alcossebre, are not included in the Park.

== See also ==
- Natural park (Spain)
