= Peniscola Castle =

Castle in Peniscola, Castellón, Valencian Community, Spain

- Valencian: Castell de Peníscola
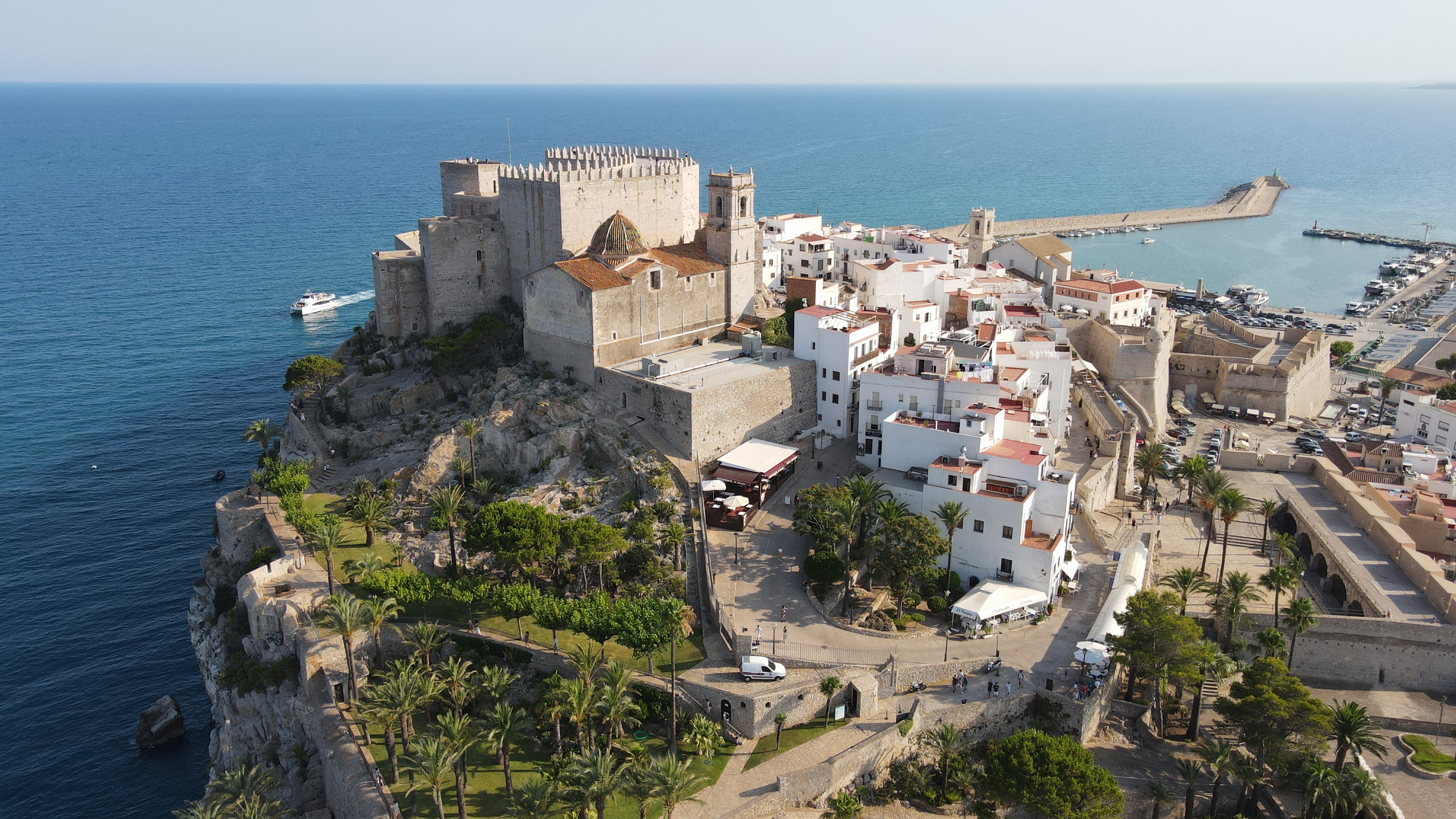
- The castle and town walls, aerial view

- Location within Spain

General information
- Location: Peniscola, province of Castellón, Spain
- Coordinates: 40°21′32″N 00°24′29″E
- Elevation: 64 metres (210 ft)
- Completed: 1307

Peniscola Castle (Spanish: Castillo de Peñíscola; Valencian: Castell de Peníscola) is a castle in Peniscola, Castellón, Valencian Community, Spain. The castle is restored and is open to the public.

The castle is situated on a crag overlooking the Mediterranean Sea, at an altitude of 64 metres (210 ft) above mean sea level.

== History ==
The earliest evidence of habitation in the area were Ibero-Roman remains excavated in the port of Peniscola; they date to the 1st–2nd centuries BC. Arab writer Al-Idrisi described Baniskula in the 11th century AD, and briefly described a Moorish castle overlooking the sea. There are no detailed descriptions until the 13th century, when James I of Aragon briefly summarised the Muslim defences. The castle was transferred to James's control in April 1229, after the last Almohad governor of Valencia, Zayd Abu Zayd, signed an accord surrendering various castles in eastern Spain.

The current form of the castle is essentially that developed by the Knights Templar, who planned to develop a kingdom centered on Peniscola. James II of Aragon gave the castle to the Templars in 1294, together with the nearby castles of Pulpís and Xivert. The Templars began work that year, demolished the Muslim fortifications, and completely rebuilt the castle; the work was completed in 1307. In common with other Templar fortifications, the castle was laid out around an inner ward and possessed a chapel. Architectural features included barrel vaulting and round arches. The basic Templar core of the castle remains intact; some changes were made by Antipope Benedict XIII in order to modify it for use as a papal residence in the early 15th century. The castle defences and the associated town fortifications were significantly upgraded from the early 16th century onward, in line with advances in military technology. The castle was massively redeveloped by military engineer Giovanni Battista Antonelli in the 16th century.

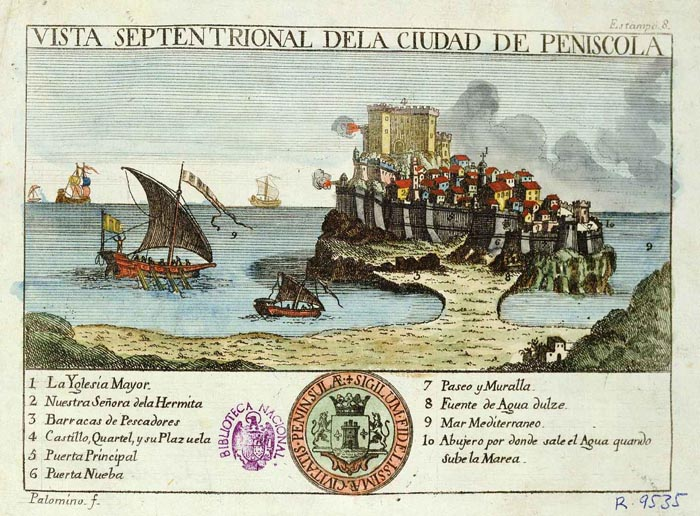
An illustration of the castle published in 1786

The castle was involved in various military conflicts of the Kingdom of Aragon, and later in the War of the Spanish Succession in the early 18th century, the Peninsula War and civil conflicts in the early 19th century, each of which impacted upon the state of the castle defences in some form. The castle garrison was finally disbanded in 1890.
