= Capicorb =

Seaside village in Spain

Coordinates: 40°12′23.67″N 00°15′31.52″E

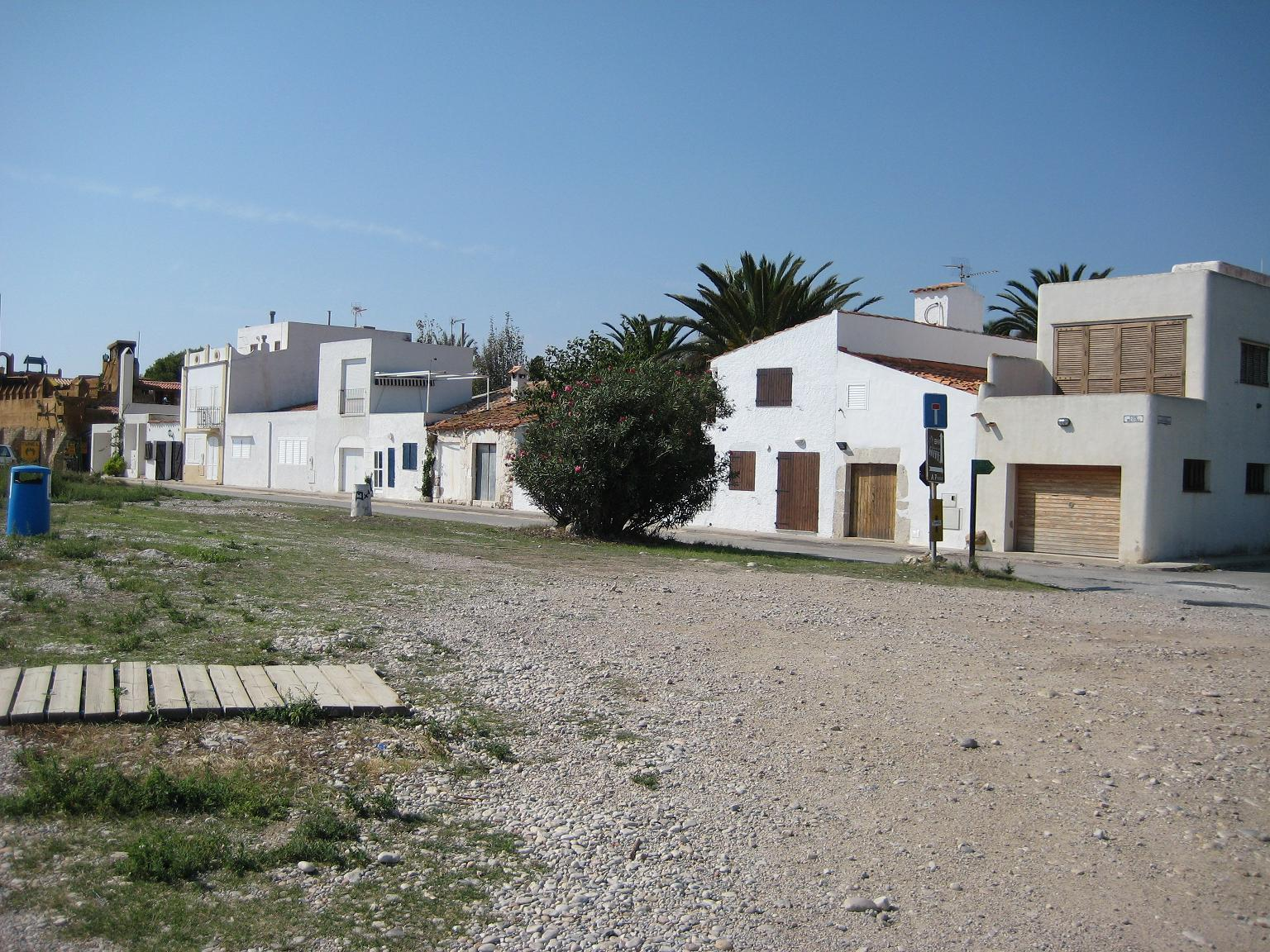
View of Capicorb

Capicorb (also written Cap i Corb, Capicorp or Cap i Corp) is a seaside village in the Valencian Community located on the Costa del Azahar along the eastern Mediterranean coast of Spain in the province of Castelló. This town falls within the municipal limits of Alcala de Xivert along with neighboring Alcossebre and Les Fonts (Las Fuentes). It is the southernmost village of the municipal term, at the boundary with Torreblanca.

== Background ==
Capicorb had 142 inhabitants in 1970, who were then mainly engaged in cattle-rearing and irrigation farming; in 2007 the population had risen to 209, with many tourists and part-time residents in the summer that have changed the economic pattern of the town.

The beaches of Capicorb are: Manyetes or Tropicana, a sandy beach, as well as Serradal and Capicorb pebble beaches. The Barranc d'Estopet and the Coves River or Sant Miquel seasonal rivers have their mouths in this coastline.

The public school was built during the Second Spanish Republic and is now used by local civic associations. There is also a small church, the Ermita de Sant Antoni, built in the 18th century and an ancient watchtower from Moorish times.

== Gallery ==
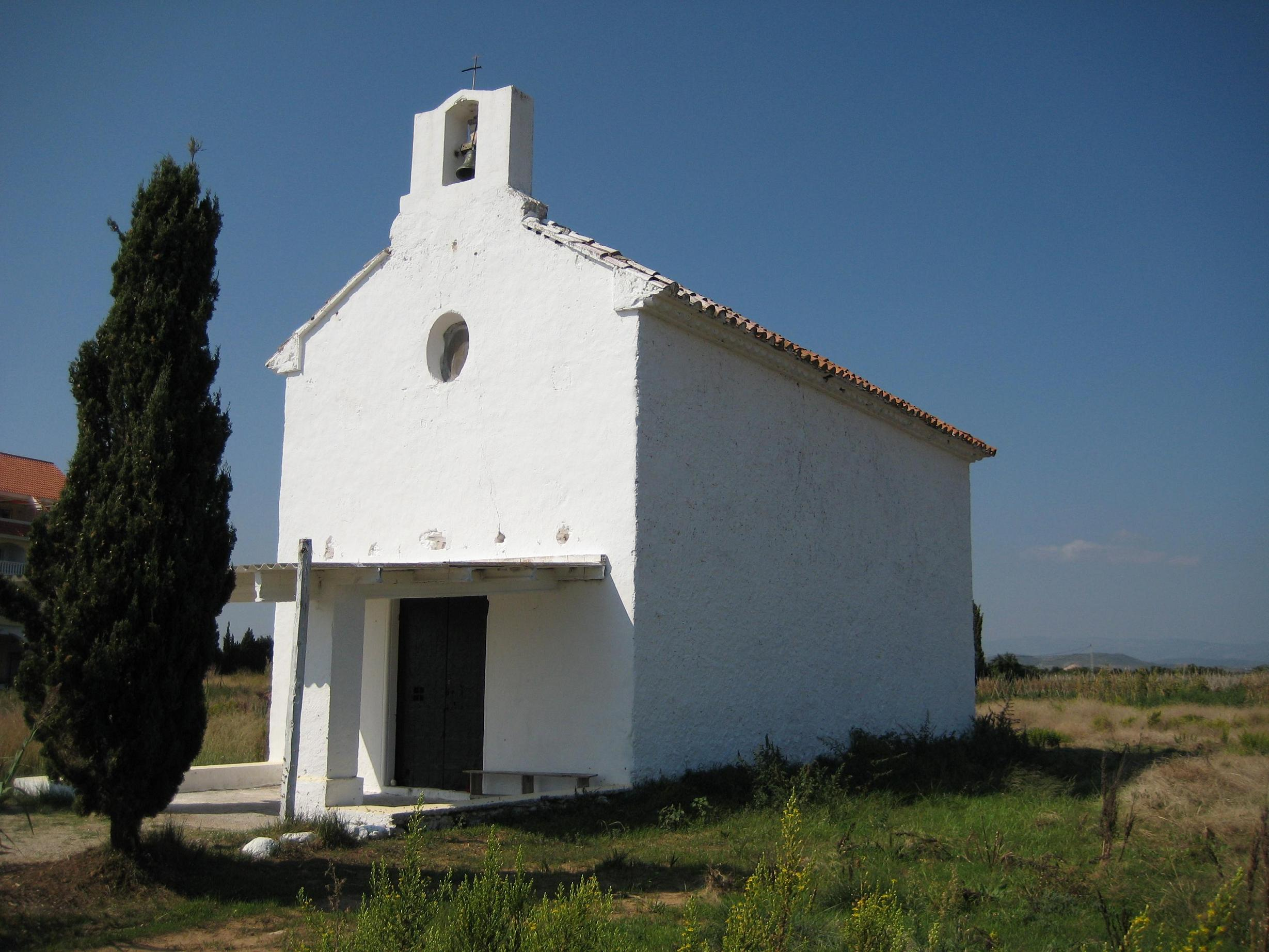
Ermita de Sant Antoni

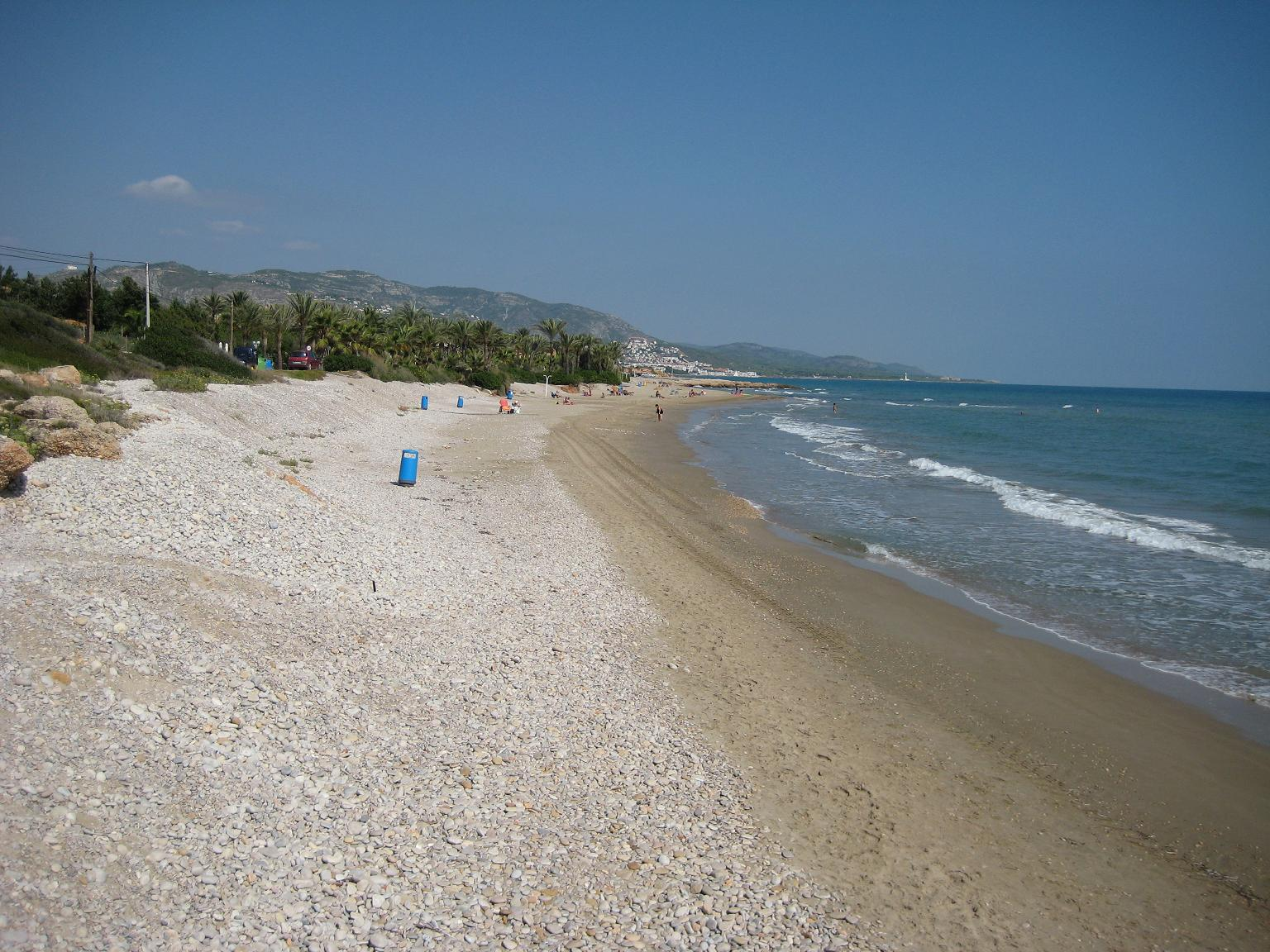
Platja de Manyetes

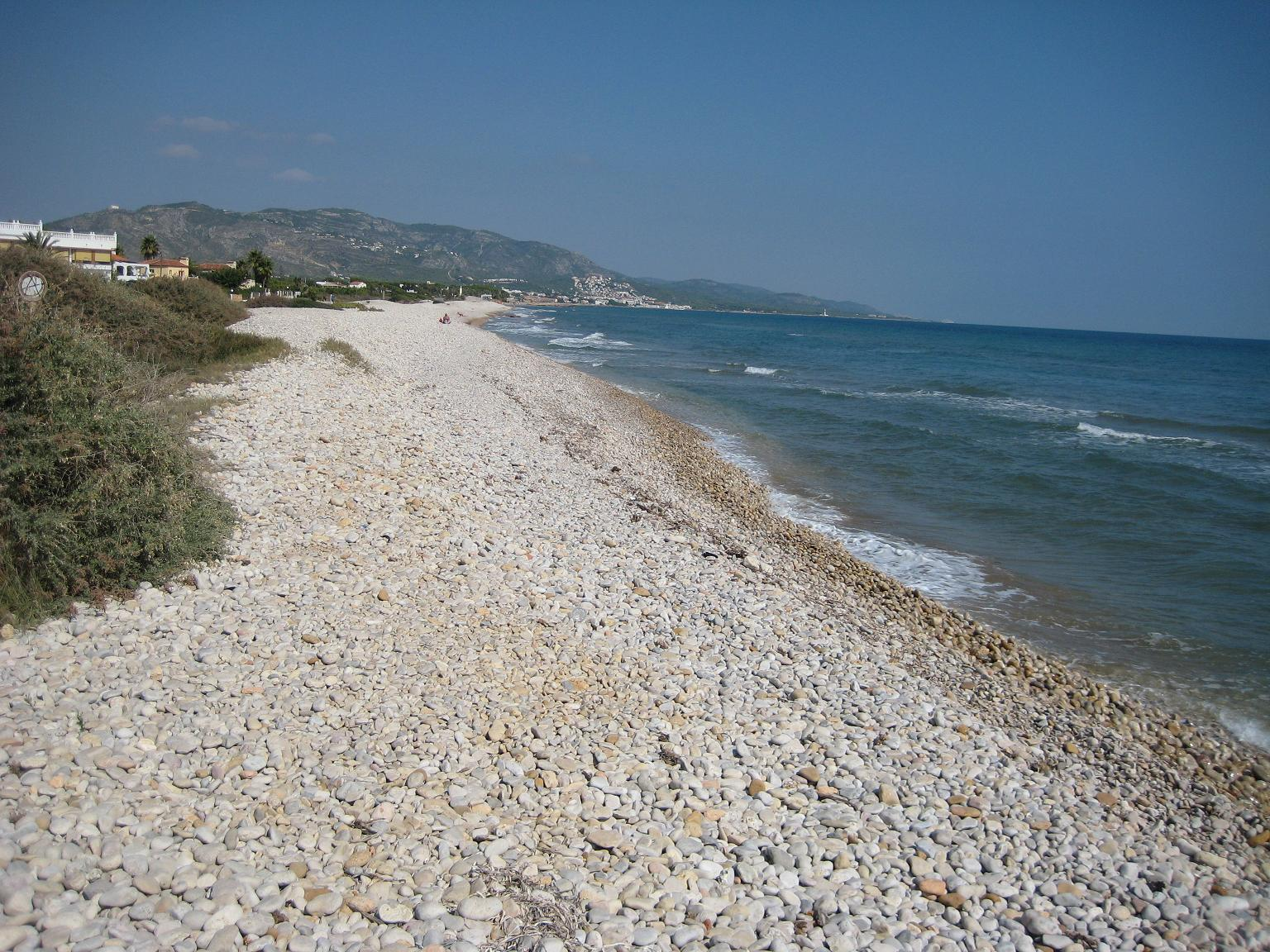
Platja del Serrada

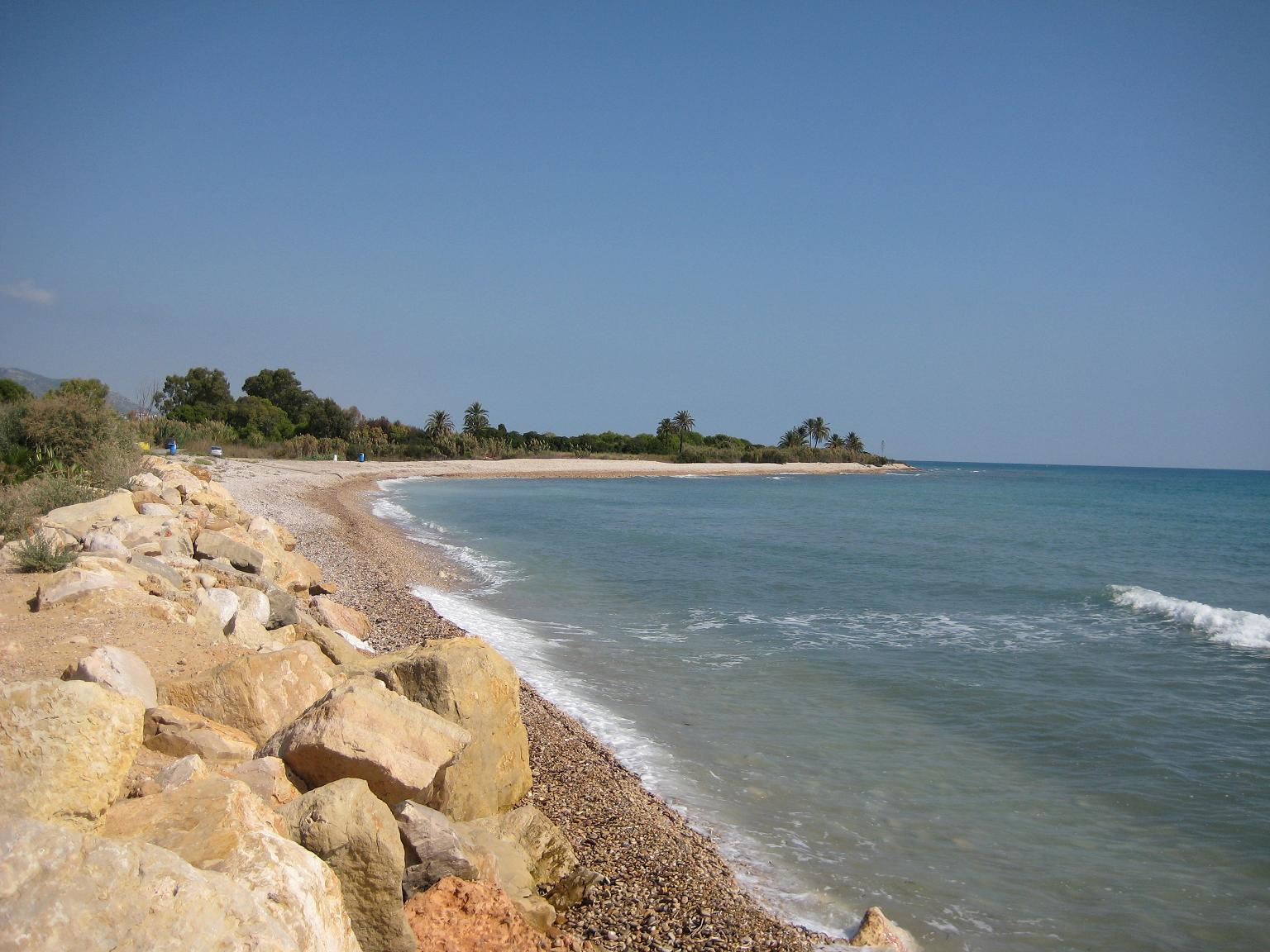
Platja de Capicorb
