= Alcossebre =

Village in Spain

Coordinates: 40°14′41″N 0°16′38″E

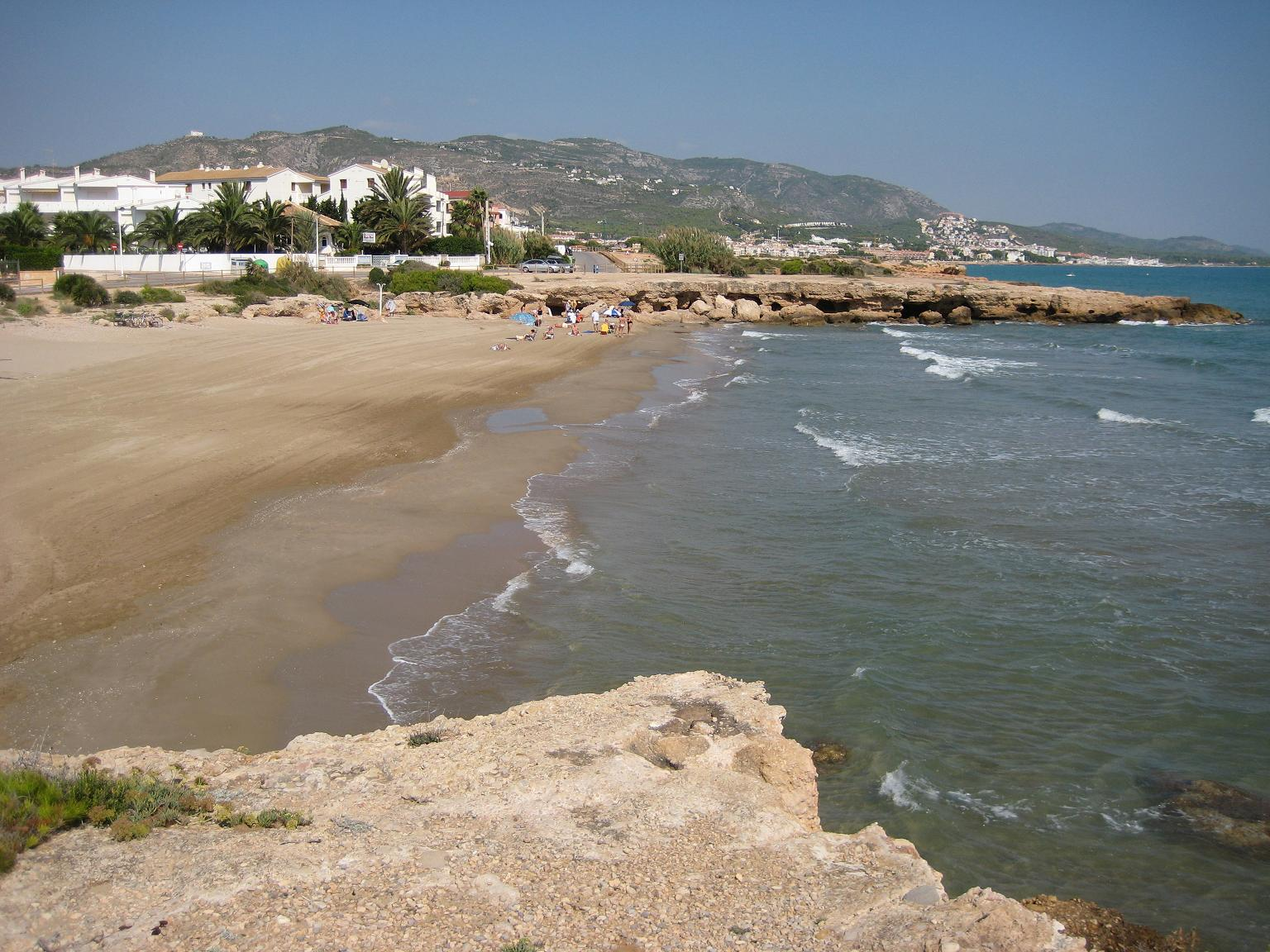
Alcossebre, view of the beach known as Platja del Moro

Alcossebre (Spanish: Alcocebre / Alcocéber) is a seaside village in the Valencian Community located on the Costa del Azahar along the eastern Mediterranean coast of Spain in the province of Castelló. This town falls within the municipal limits of Alcala de Xivert along with neighboring Capicorb and Les Fonts (Las Fuentes). It is a popular tourist destination without too many large buildings.

== Background ==
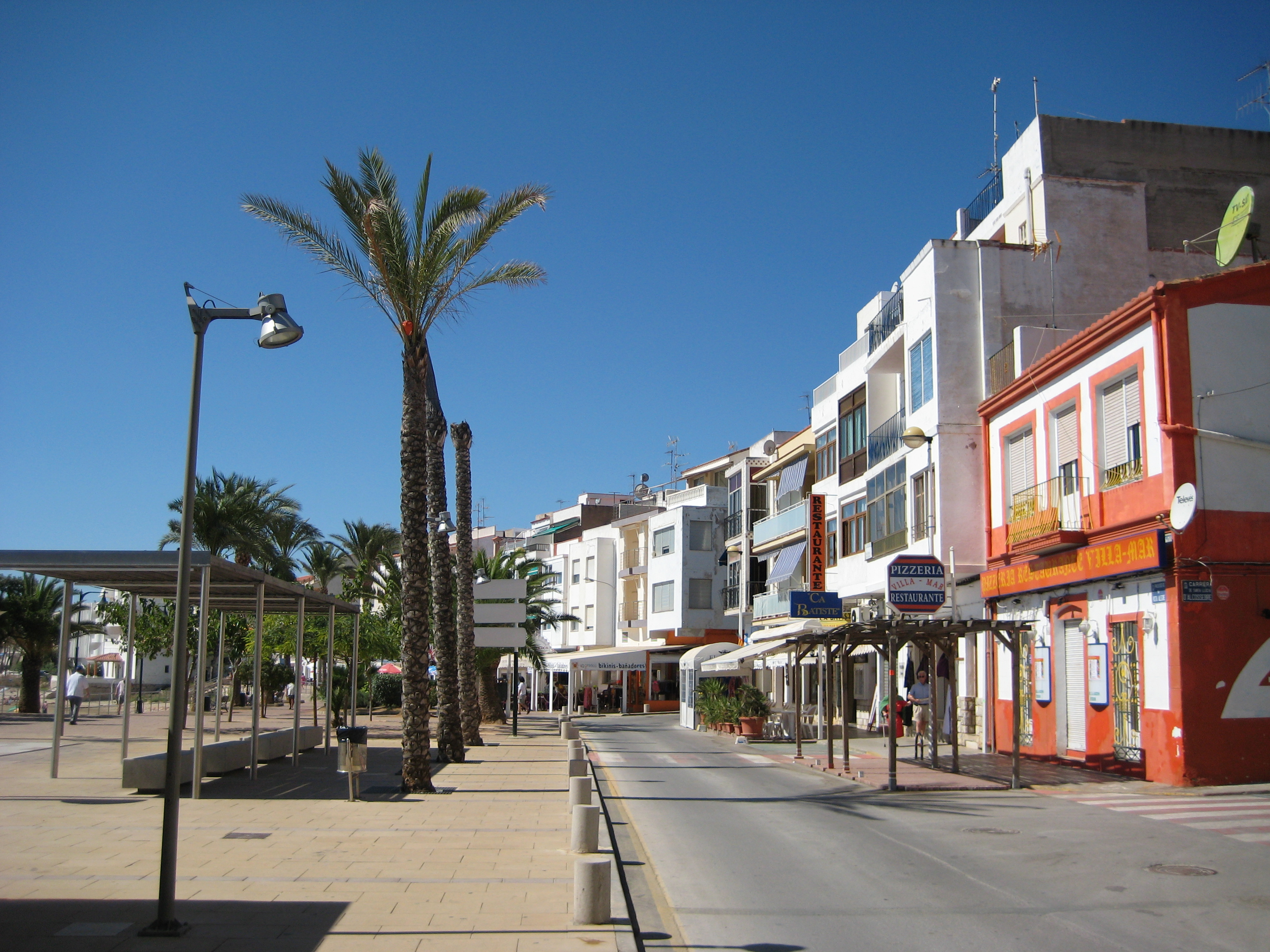
Seaside promenade

This small coastal village is located at the southern end of the Serra d'Irta, with ten kilometers of coastline, five beaches of great quality and a variety of other unspoiled beaches. Unlike most of the coastal towns Alcossebre is one of the few towns that is not fully urbanized.

It is part of the Costa del Azahar, bordering with Peniscola in the north and Torreblanca in the south.

== Attractions ==
Along Alcossebre's ten kilometers of coastline, there are four main beaches: Carregador, El Romà, El Moro and Manyetes (or Tropicana), the latter shared with Capicorb, that have the Blue flag as a sign of quality. There are also three coves: Tres Platges (Tres playas), a set of three bays separated by rocky formations whose bed is rock, Cala del Moro, which is separated from the beach with the same name by a small dune and the Cala Blanca which is located near the lighthouse.

The beach of Les Fonts (Las Fuentes) is one of the most visited. It has a length of 360 meters and a width of 32 meters. There are some freshwater sources that sprout from the sand originating in the karstic system of the Sierra de Irta. The beach has lost its blue flag status due to the continuous problems with the presence of fecal bacteria in the water.

The Columbretes Islands lie far off the coast and can be seen in the distance in clear weather.
