= Torreblanca =

- Municipality
- Coat of arms

- Location in Spain
- Coordinates: 40°13′14″N 0°11′43″E
- Country: Spain
- Autonomous community: Valencian Community
- Province: Castellón
- Comarca: Plana Alta
- Judicial district: Castellón de la Plana

Area
  - Total: 29.8 km^{2} (11.5 sq mi)
- Elevation: 31 m (102 ft)

Population (2025-01-01)
  - Total: 5,744
  - Density: 193/km^{2} (499/sq mi)
- Demonym(s): Torreblanquí, torreblanquina
- Time zone: UTC+1 (CET)
  - Summer (DST): UTC+2 (CEST)
- Postal code: 12596
- Official language(s): Valencian and Spanish

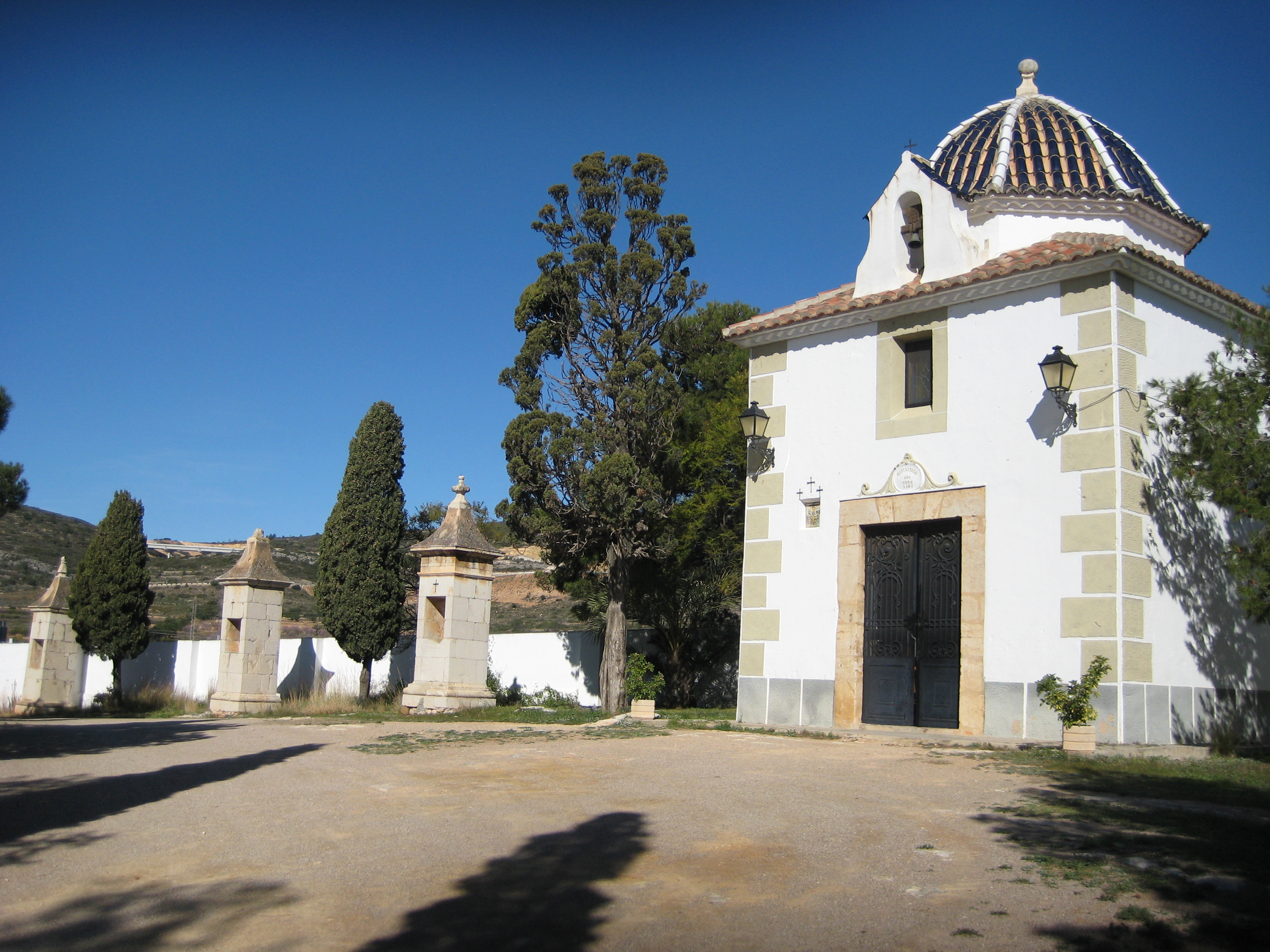
Ermita del Santíssim Crist and part of the Calvari

Torreblanca is a municipality in the province of Castellón, Valencian Community, Spain. The town is located south of the Serra d'Irta mountain range close to the Mediterranean Sea.

Torreblanca is located 36 km ENE of the town of Castellón de la Plana, on the Costa del Azahar.

== History ==
Torreblanca was conquered from the Saracens by James I of Aragon in the 13th century and repopulated. In 1379 Torreblanca was raided by Barbary corsairs and the town was razed to the ground. Torreblanca was again the scenario of violent battles during the Carlist Wars in the 19th century. There are wetlands by the sea close to the town and there were cases of malaria in the surrounding area until the mid-20th century, when malaria was finally eradicated.

Nowadays Torreblanca's economy is based on seasonal tourism. Platja de Torrenostra and Platja Nord, the two beaches within its municipal term, are relatively unspoilt and quite popular in the summer.

== Villages ==
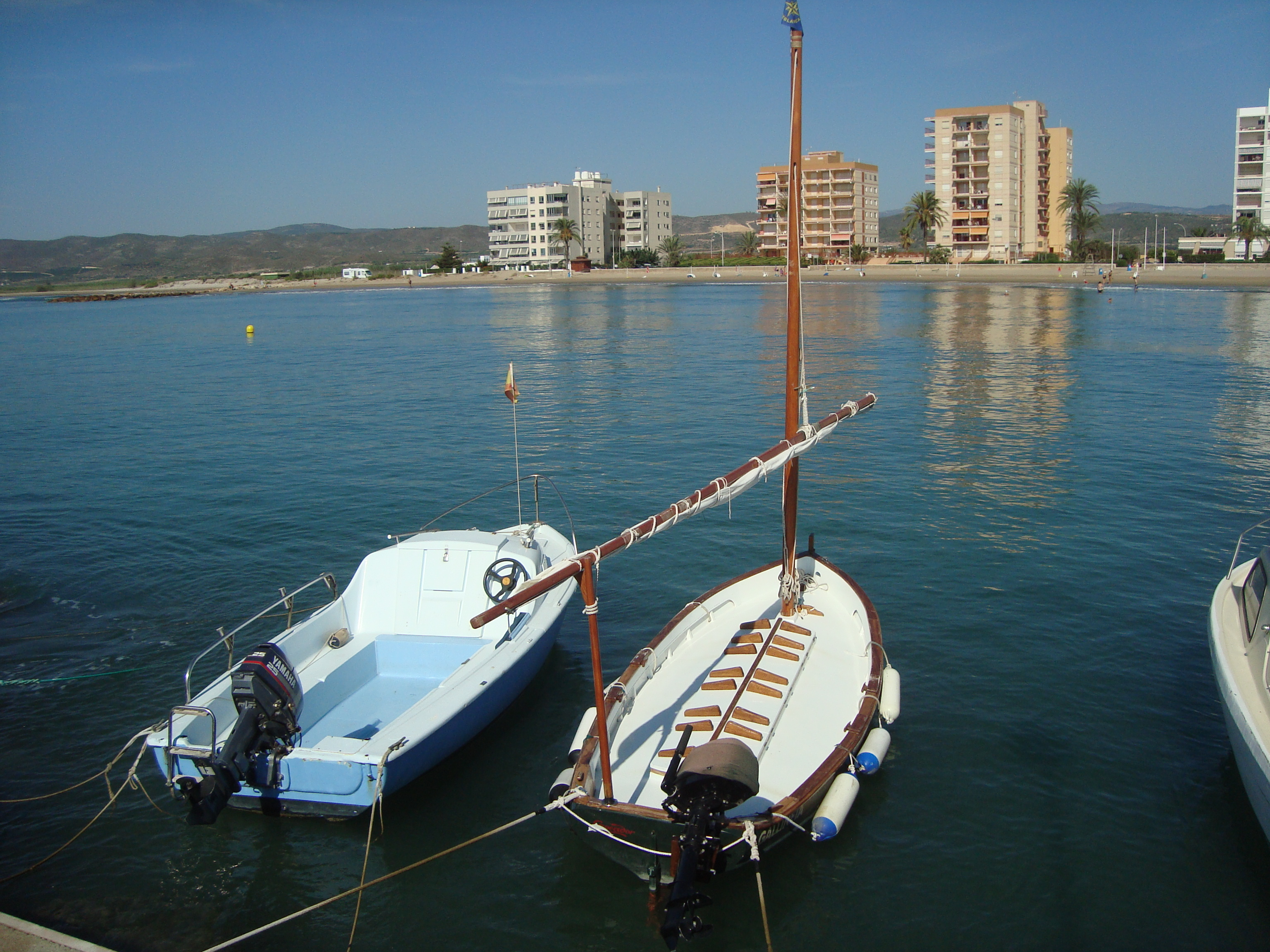
- Torrenostra Beach (Torreblanca)
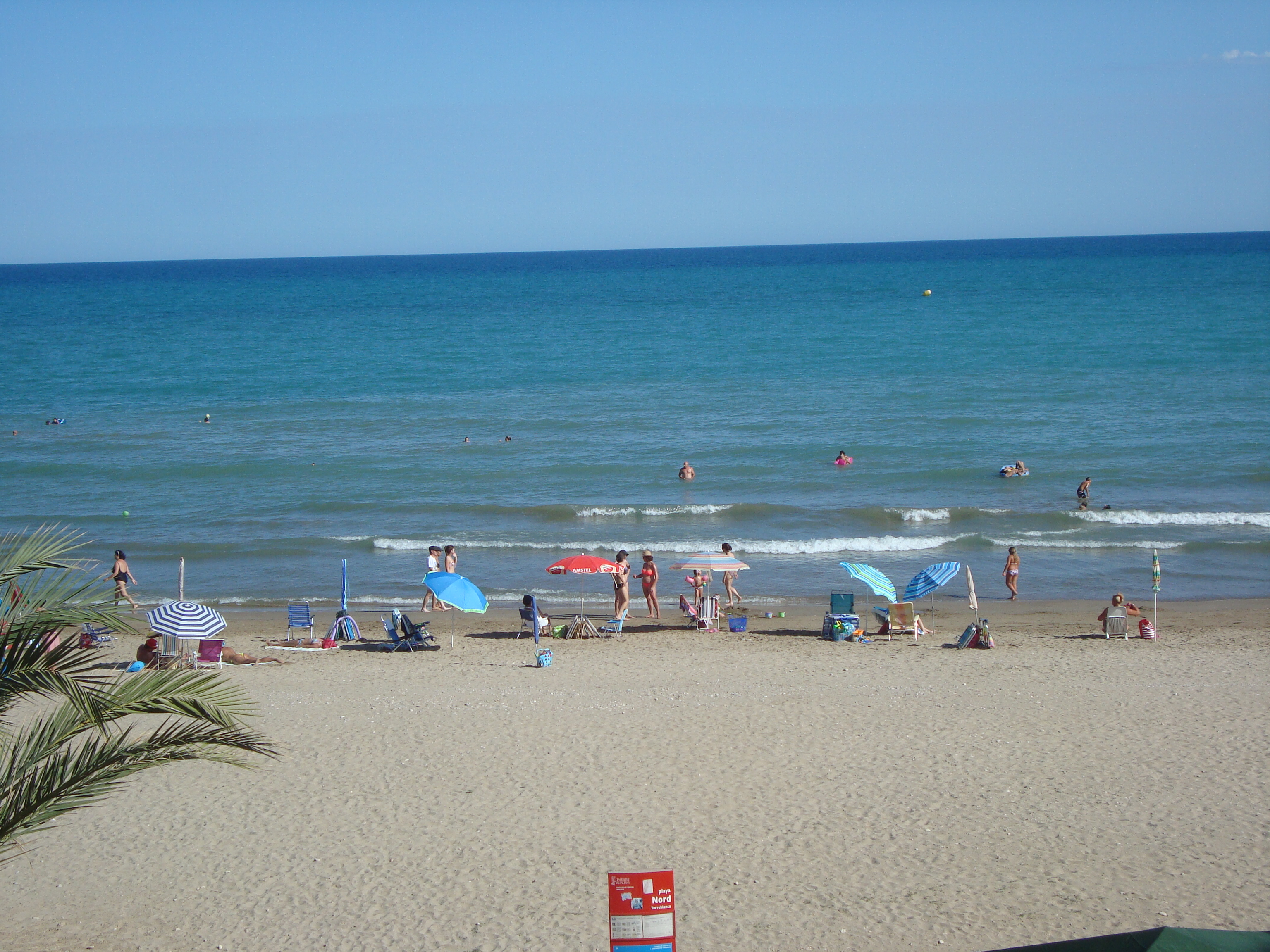
  Torreblanca North Beach
  Torreblanca
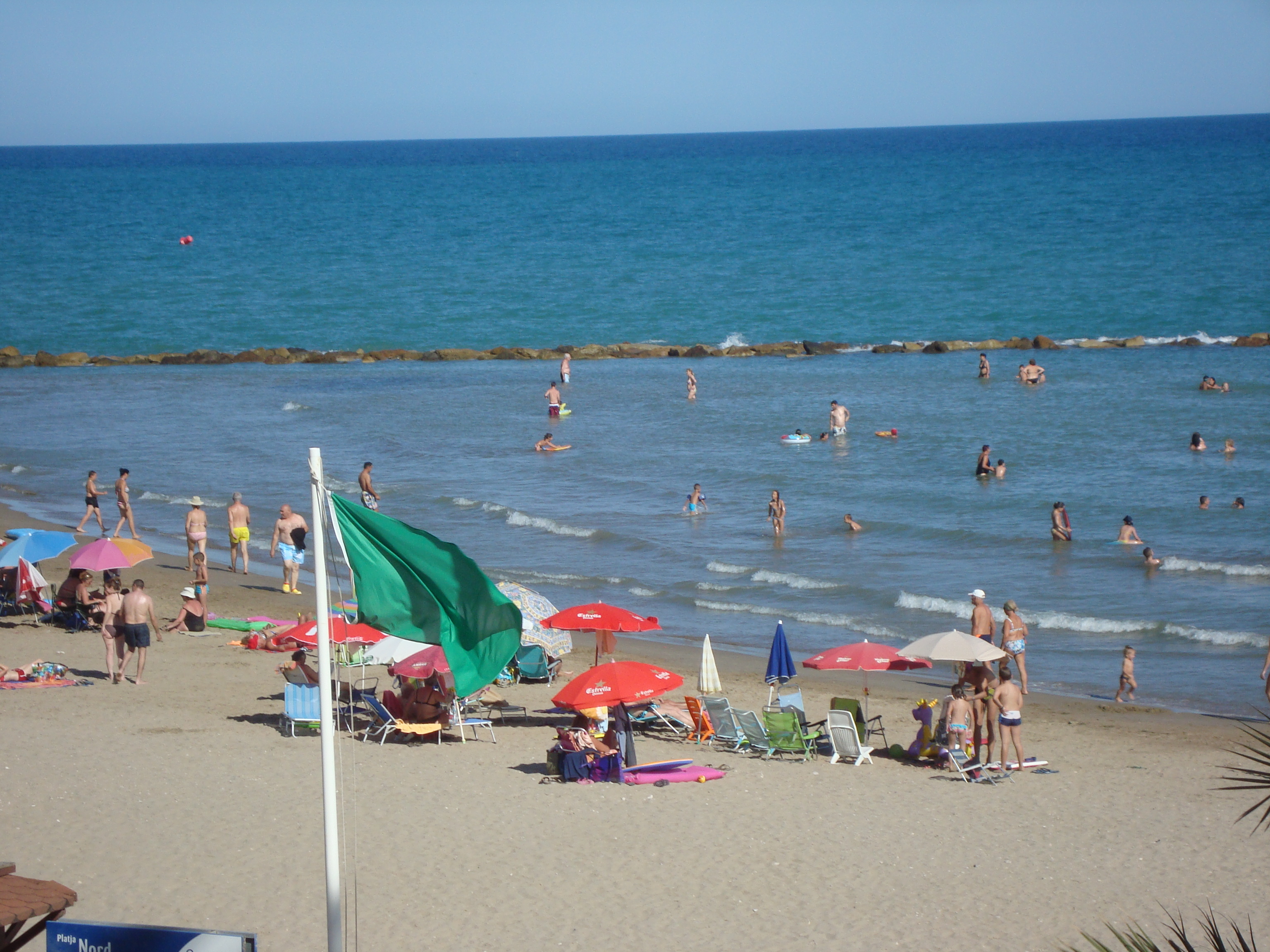
- Torreblanca North Beach
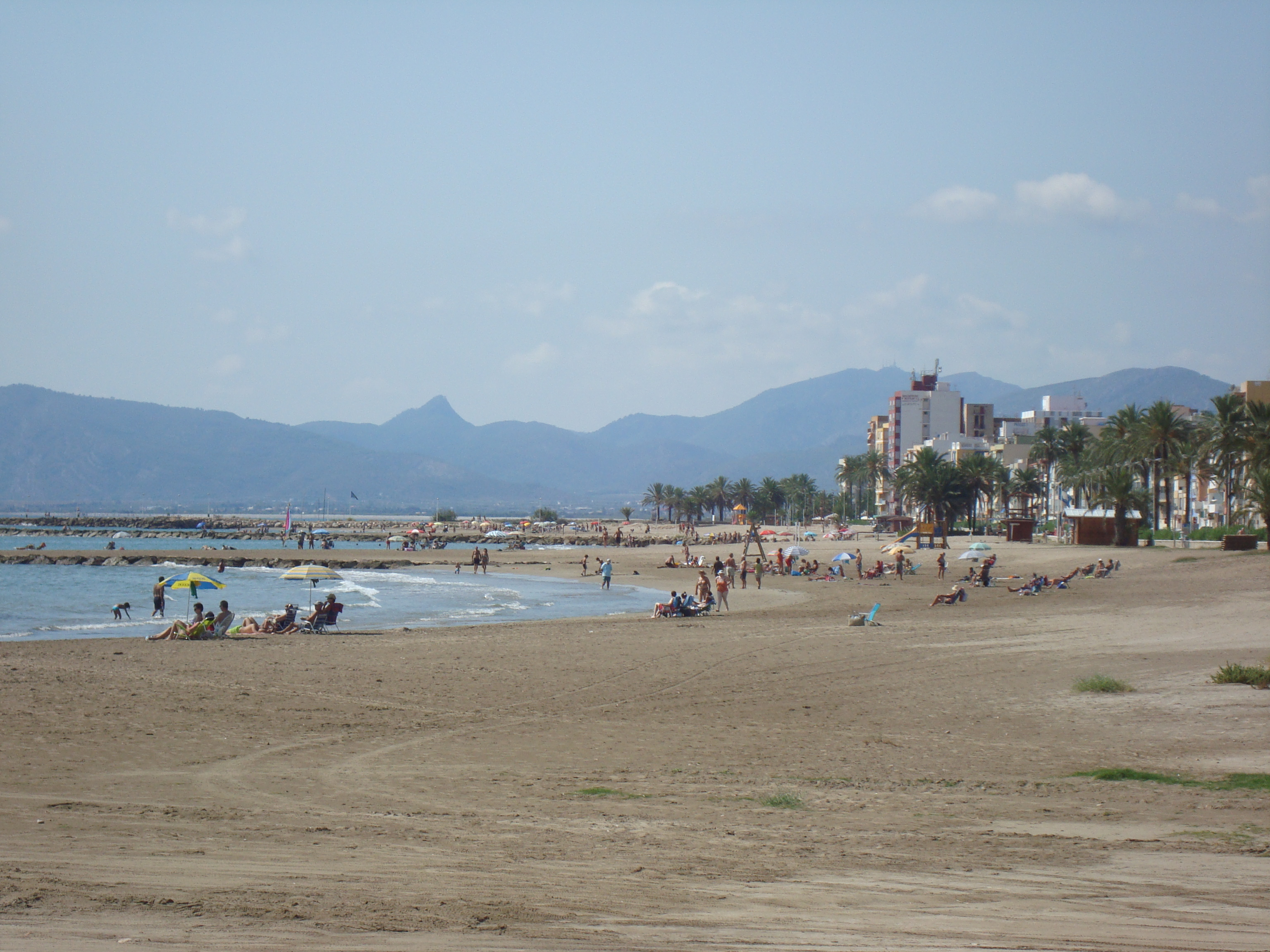
  Torreblanca North Beach
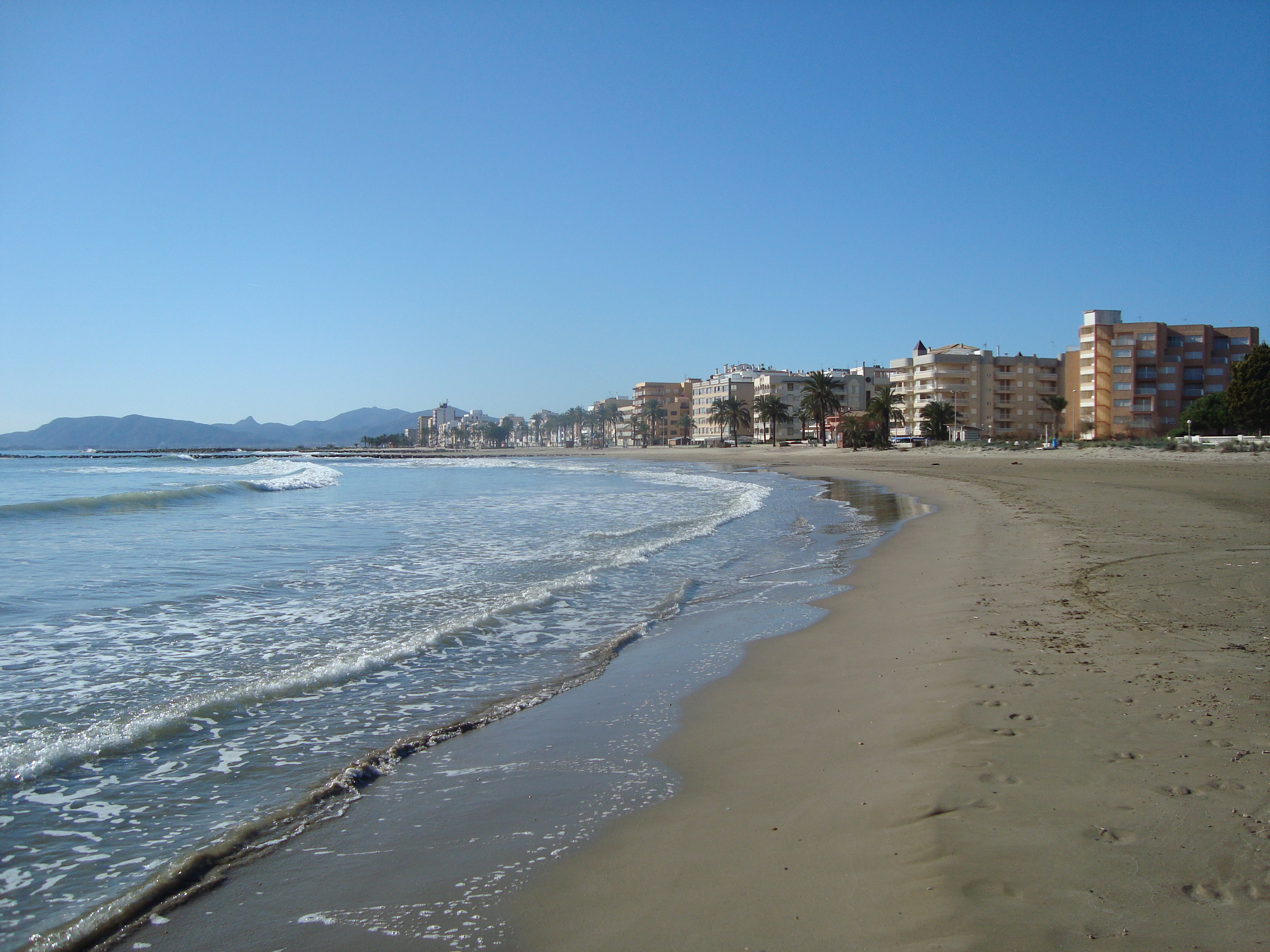
  Torreblanca North Beach, Playa Norte de Torrenostra (Torreblanca)
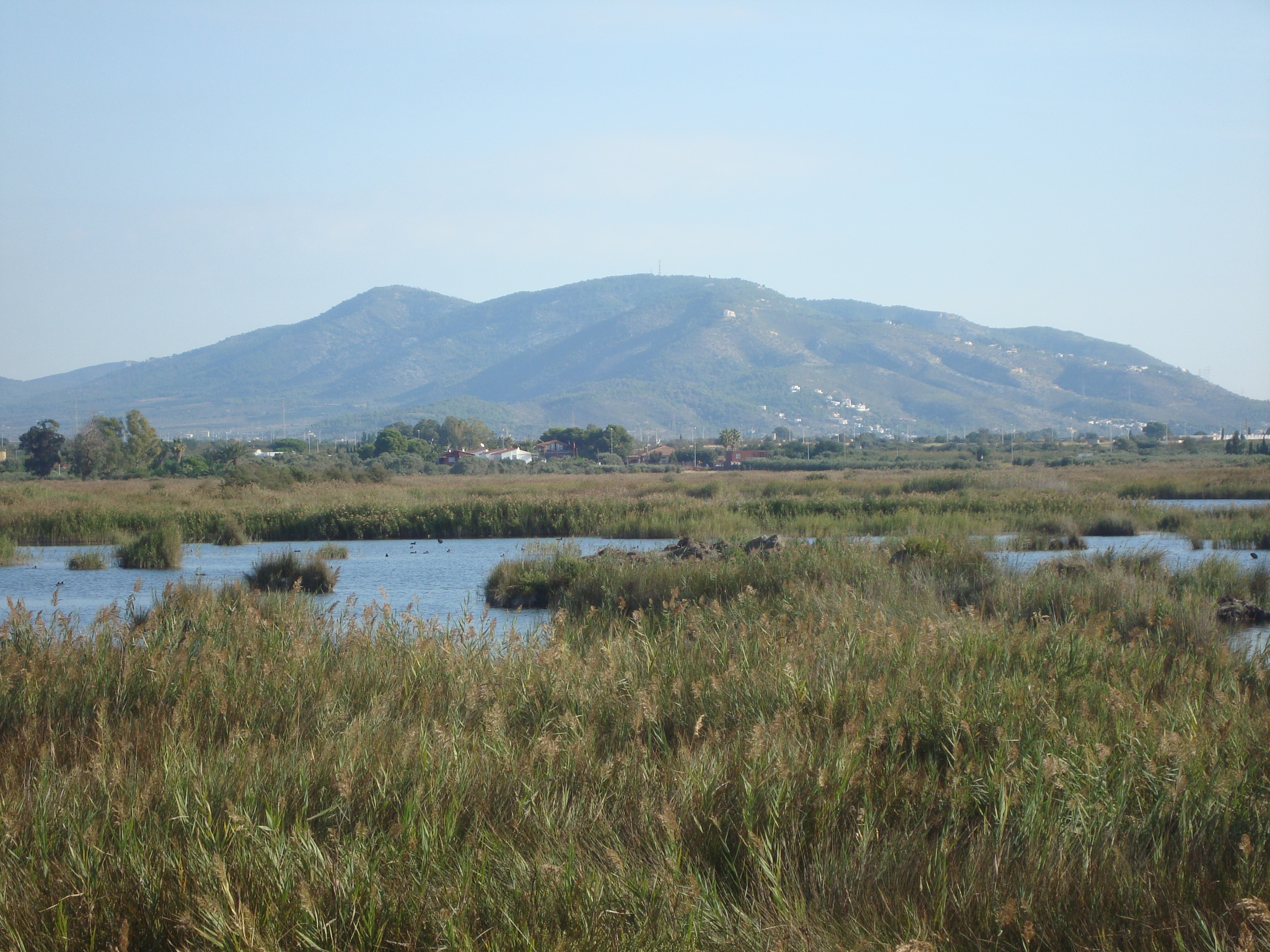
  Paraje Natural del Prat de Cabanes-Torreblanca
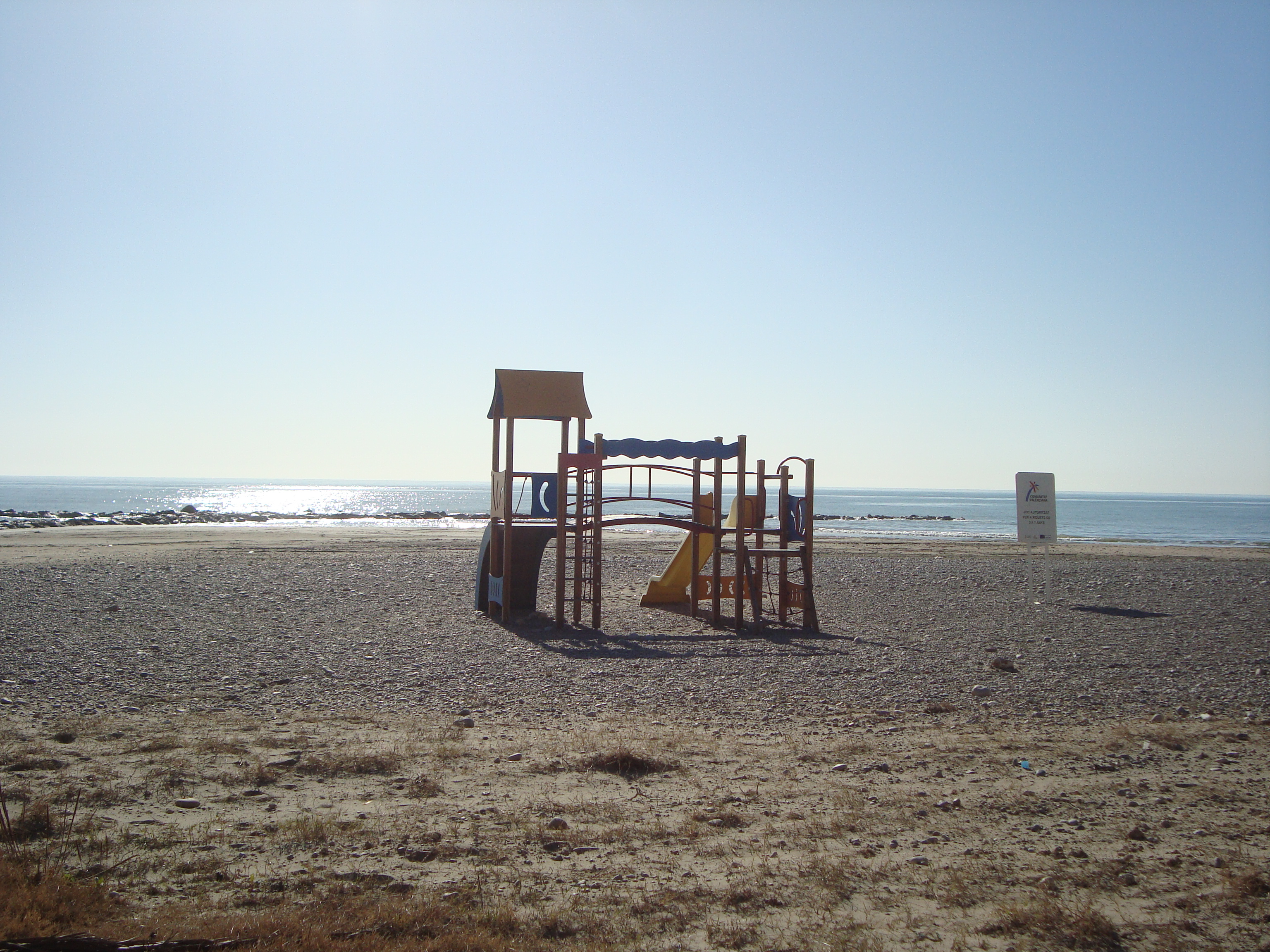
  Playa de Torreblanca
  Torrenostra

== Business ==
- Acesur

== Notable people ==
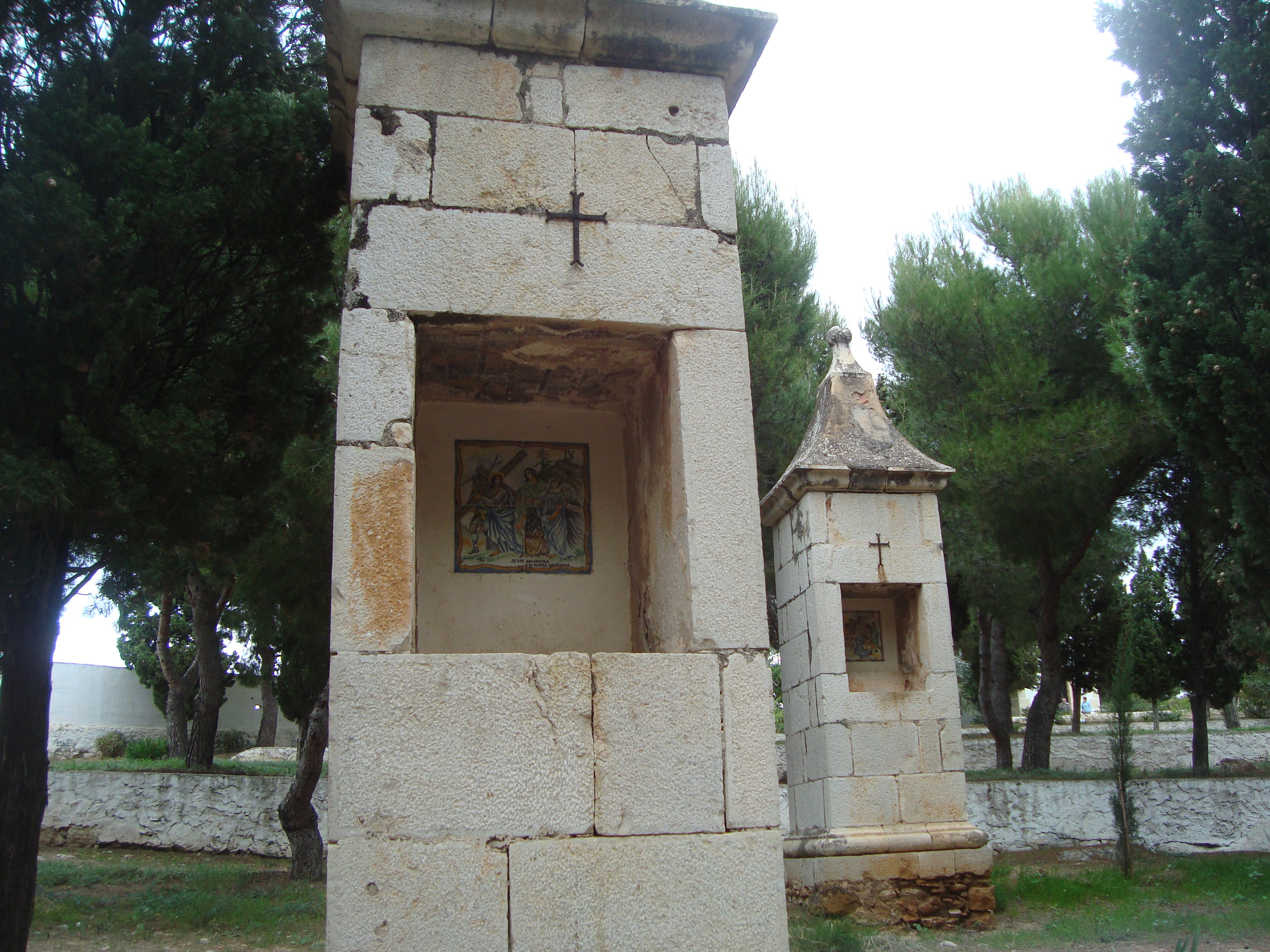
- Capillas del Calvario de Torreblanca del siglo XVIII
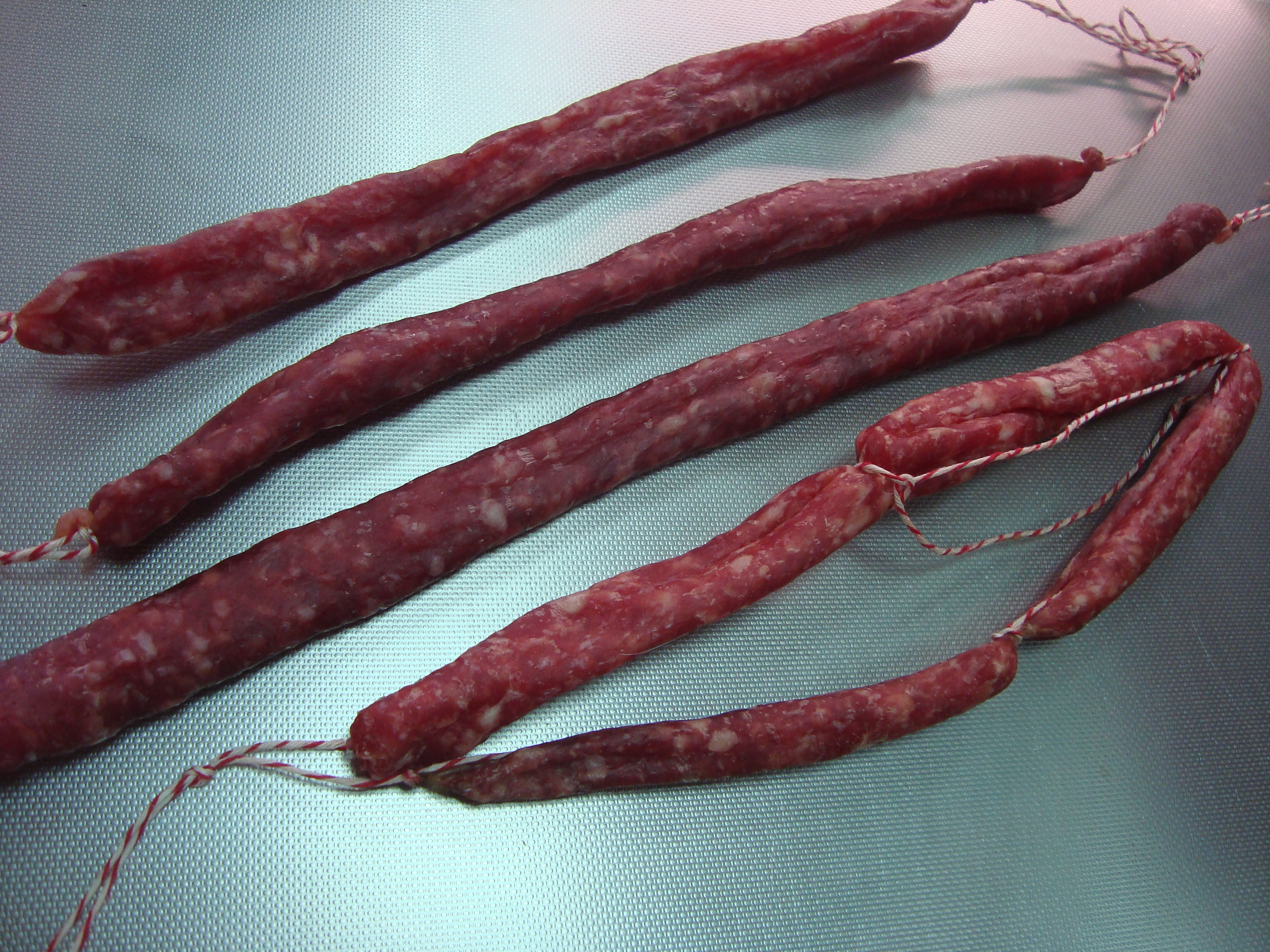
  Longaniza seca torreblanquina, producto típico, Torreblanca
  Joan Barreda
