= Acesur =

Acesur is a leading company within the olive oil sector in Spain, with 100% Spanish capital share and among the top five in the international market. Its activities revolve around the production, refining, bottling, marketing and exportation of olive and vegetable oil as well as olives, vinegars, sauces, mayonnaises and condiments. It owns brands known as "La Española", "Coosur", and "Al Amir". Acesur has received prizes such as the Aster award.

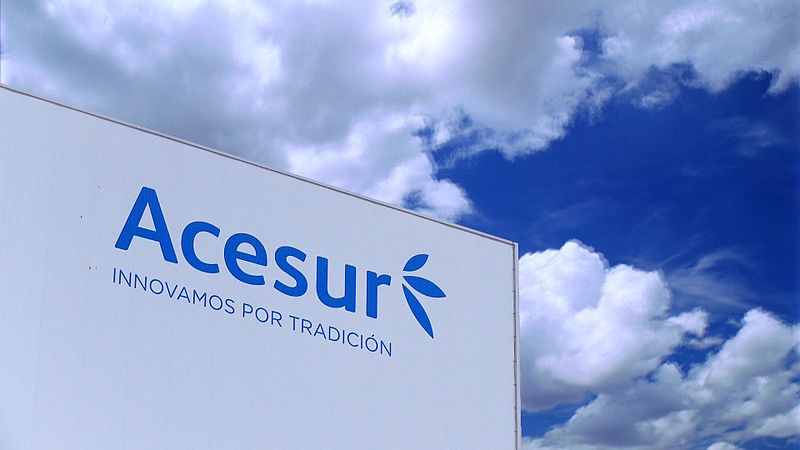
Innovamos por tradición.

== Overview ==
Acesur was founded in 1840. Nowadays it has more than 600 employees in Dos Hermanas, La Roda de Andalucia (Sevilla), Tarancón (Cuenca), Madrid, Mora de Toledo (Toledo), Vilches, Puente del Obispo, and Jabalquinto (Jaén). 35% of the company's turnover consists of exports to more than 80 countries worldwide. The main brands that Acesur offers are "La Española" and "Coosur".

Acesur has formed a renewable energies division called Enersur with three main branches: biomass, electric cogeneration, and biodiesel.

== History ==
The company was founded in 1840. In the following year, "Luca de Tena" was registered in Seville. "Hijos de Luca de Tena" was registered in 1891.

In 1947, the old company was sold and "Aceites y Jabones Luca de Tena" was created instead. In 1948, "Luca de Tena, S.A." was created. The whole group was reconstituted as a Public Limited Company in 1952 and as Public Corporations in 1953. In 1968, "Aceites Giralda, S.A." was created.

In 1974, Aceites y Jabones Luca de Tena, S.A. sold the company name "Aceites Giralda, S.A." in a complete reorganization that ended up with the removal to the group's location at La Palmera Industrial. Some of the company's brands were sold. Others were grouped to establish the generic name "Olivarera Internacional, S.A." (OLIVASA).

In 1975, exports began to the United States, where the company eventually became one of the main olive oil suppliers. In 1976, the Guillen family, renowned olive oil experts, joined the company. In 1988, the whole group was renamed "Aceites del Sur, S.A." to highlight the origin of the Andalusian oils and to improve investments and other marketing aspects. In 1989, the "La Española" brand was positioned in Brazil with distributors in Salvador de Bahia (Paez Mendoça), Rio de Janeiro (Sendas), São Paulo, Curitiba, and Florianópolis. In 1990, Aceites del Sur, S.A. celebrated its 150-year anniversary. Between 1995-1996, the company grew in the Brazilian market and began negotiations with Cargill.

In 2000, a factory and refinery in Aleppo, Syria was built for bottled olive oil sales in the country and export to other Middle East countries such as Saudi Arabia, Kuwait, Iran or Yemen. In 2002, the company purchased Coosur in Vilches, Jaén and Olcesa in Tarancón, Cuenca. In 2004, exports to China accounted for 10% of that country's olive oil imports, mainly with the "La Española" and "Coosur" brands. In 2008, an olive waste plant was purchased in Jabalquinto. Jaen. In 2009, a cogeneration plant was opened there. With the growth of the company, "Acesur" became the name for the whole group.

In 2010, Acesur bought Duendesol, entering the sauce market. As part of the company's social responsibility, the Juan Ramon Guillen Foundation was established to improve olive fields as a heritage of humanity. In 2011, a biodiesel plant began operation in Tarancon. Acesur's exports reached more than 80 countries.

== Facilities ==
Acesur operates facilities across Spain and internationally.

- Dos Hermanas (Seville): head office, Department Directives' offices, and production of export products
- Hacienda Guzman (La Rinconada, Seville): head office of the Juan Ramon Guillen Foundation
- La Roda de Andalucía (Seville): olive milling, oil storage, table oil production, treatment of olive waste
- Puente del Obispo (Jaen): treatment of olive waste
- Jabalquinto (Jaen): treatment of olive waste
- Vilches (Jaen): refining, bottling and storage of the company's products
- Tarancon (Cuenca): biodiesel plant, production of sunflower oil
- Madrid: marketing and business offices
- Aleppo (Syria): olive oil production for the Middle East market

== Awards ==
- 2002: Prince Felipe Business Excellence in the International category, conferred by the Ministry of Industry, Tourism and Trade
- 2002: Top prize to La Española Extra Virgin Olive Oil, conferred by the Spanish Magazine Distribución Actualidad
- 2005: Golden award to La Española Extra Virgin Olive Oil in the category of fats, butters and margarines, conferred by the German Magazine Lebbensmittel Praxis
- 2007: Family-Company award conferred by the San Telmo International Institute.
- 2008: Doñana prize for sustainability
- 2010: "Foods from Spain" prize in 2010 to the Alimentary Industry.
- 2011: Aster award, conferred by the Graduate School of Marketing and Commercial Management
