= Costa de Valencia =

Coastal area in Valencia, Spain

Coordinates: 39.47°N 0.32°W

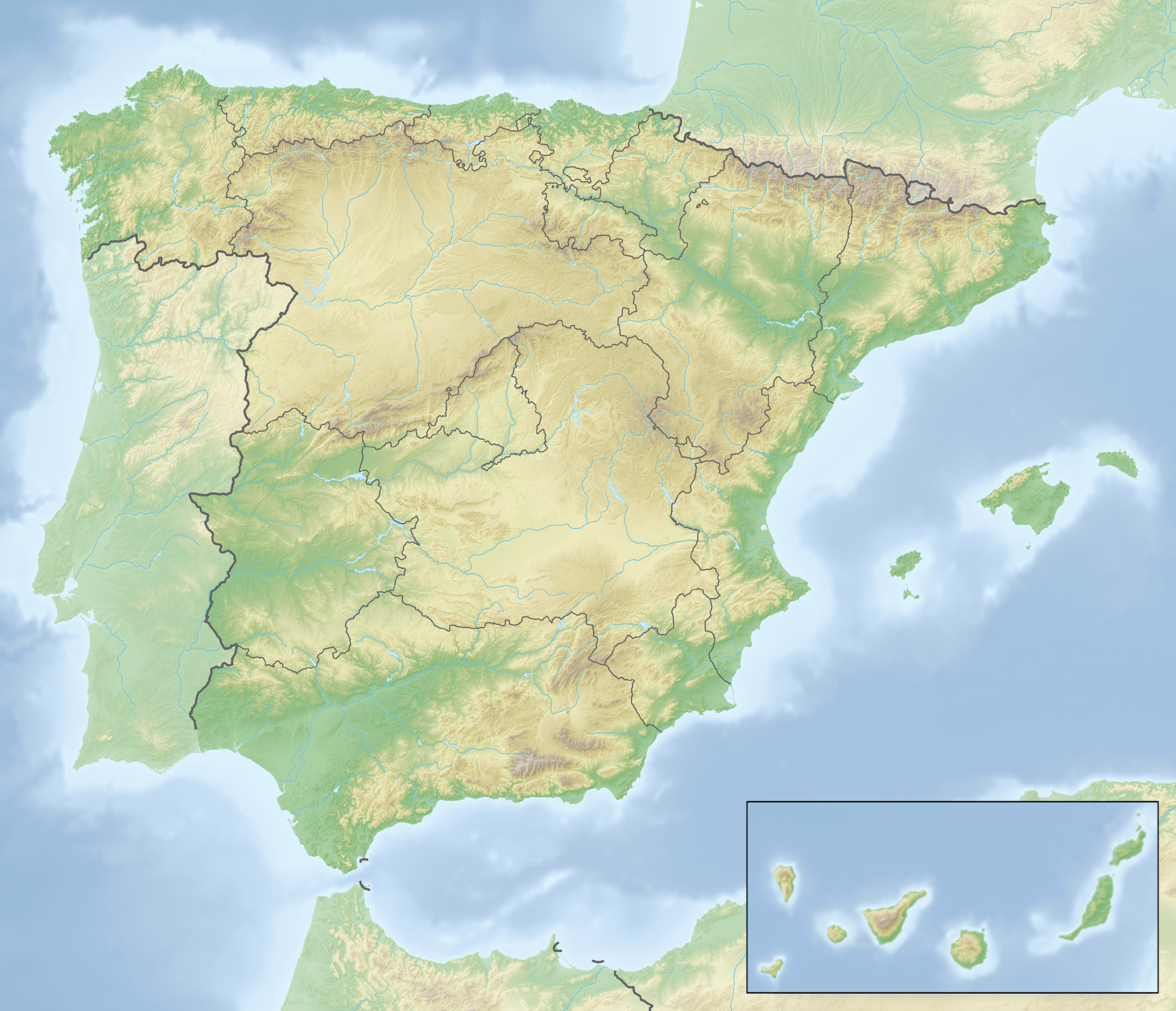
Costa de Valencia in Spain

The Costa de Valencia (Spanish: [ˈkosta ðe βaˈlenθja]; Valencian: Costa de València [ˈkɔsta ðe vaˈlensia], also [ˈkɔstɔ ðe vaˈlensia]; literally meaning "Coast of Valencia") is coastline and tourism region of the province of Valencia in the Valencian Community, Spain. It covers the coast along the Gulf of Valencia on the Balearic Sea in western part of the Mediterranean Sea. It's located around the city of Valencia and extends from the Camp de Morvedre in the north to Safor in the south.

The Costa de Valencia has the most beaches with Blue Flag status in Spain.

To its north is the Costa del Azahar (in province of Castellón) and to the south lies the Costa Blanca (in the province of Alicante).

== Climate ==
Valencia region have a Mediterranean climate (Köppen: Csa) bordering on a semi-arid climate (Köppen: BSh) with mild winters and warm to hot, dry summers.

Climate data for Valencia
Month	Jan	Feb	Mar	Apr	May	Jun	Jul	Aug	Sep	Oct	Nov	Dec	Year
Mean daily maximum °C (°F)	16.7 (62.1)	17.4 (63.3)	19.3 (66.7)	21.1 (70.0)	23.9 (75.0)	27.3 (81.1)	29.7 (85.5)	30.3 (86.5)	27.8 (82.0)	24.5 (76.1)	20.1 (68.2)	17.3 (63.1)	23.0 (73.3)
Daily mean °C (°F)	12.2 (54.0)	12.8 (55.0)	14.7 (58.5)	16.6 (61.9)	19.5 (67.1)	23.1 (73.6)	25.7 (78.3)	26.2 (79.2)	23.5 (74.3)	20.0 (68.0)	15.6 (60.1)	12.9 (55.2)	18.6 (65.4)
Mean daily minimum °C (°F)	7.7 (45.9)	8.2 (46.8)	10.0 (50.0)	12.0 (53.6)	15.1 (59.2)	18.8 (65.8)	21.7 (71.1)	22.2 (72.0)	19.2 (66.6)	15.6 (60.1)	11.1 (52.0)	8.5 (47.3)	14.2 (57.5)
Average precipitation mm (inches)	38.6 (1.52)	29.8 (1.17)	39.5 (1.56)	32.7 (1.29)	36.2 (1.43)	26.3 (1.04)	6.7 (0.26)	14.7 (0.58)	72.2 (2.84)	63.4 (2.50)	51.6 (2.03)	46.2 (1.82)	457.9 (18.04)
Average precipitation days (≥ 1mm)	4.1	3.5	4.1	4.5	4.2	2.2	1.2	2.3	5.2	4.7	4.3	4.3	44.6
Mean monthly sunshine hours	168.0	174.2	210.5	232.7	260.2	276.7	307.6	282.6	231.4	201.2	166.2	151.8	2,663.1
Source: NOAA/NCEI

Average daily sea temperature:
Jan	Feb	Mar	Apr	May	Jun	Jul	Aug	Sep	Oct	Nov	Dec	Year
14.2 °C (57.6 °F)	13.8 °C (56.8 °F)	14.1 °C (57.4 °F)	16.1 °C (61.0 °F)	18.8 °C (65.8 °F)	22.5 °C (72.5 °F)	24.8 °C (76.6 °F)	25.8 °C (78.4 °F)	24.6 °C (76.3 °F)	22.1 °C (71.8 °F)	19.1 °C (66.4 °F)	16.1 °C (61.0 °F)	19.3 °C (66.7 °F)

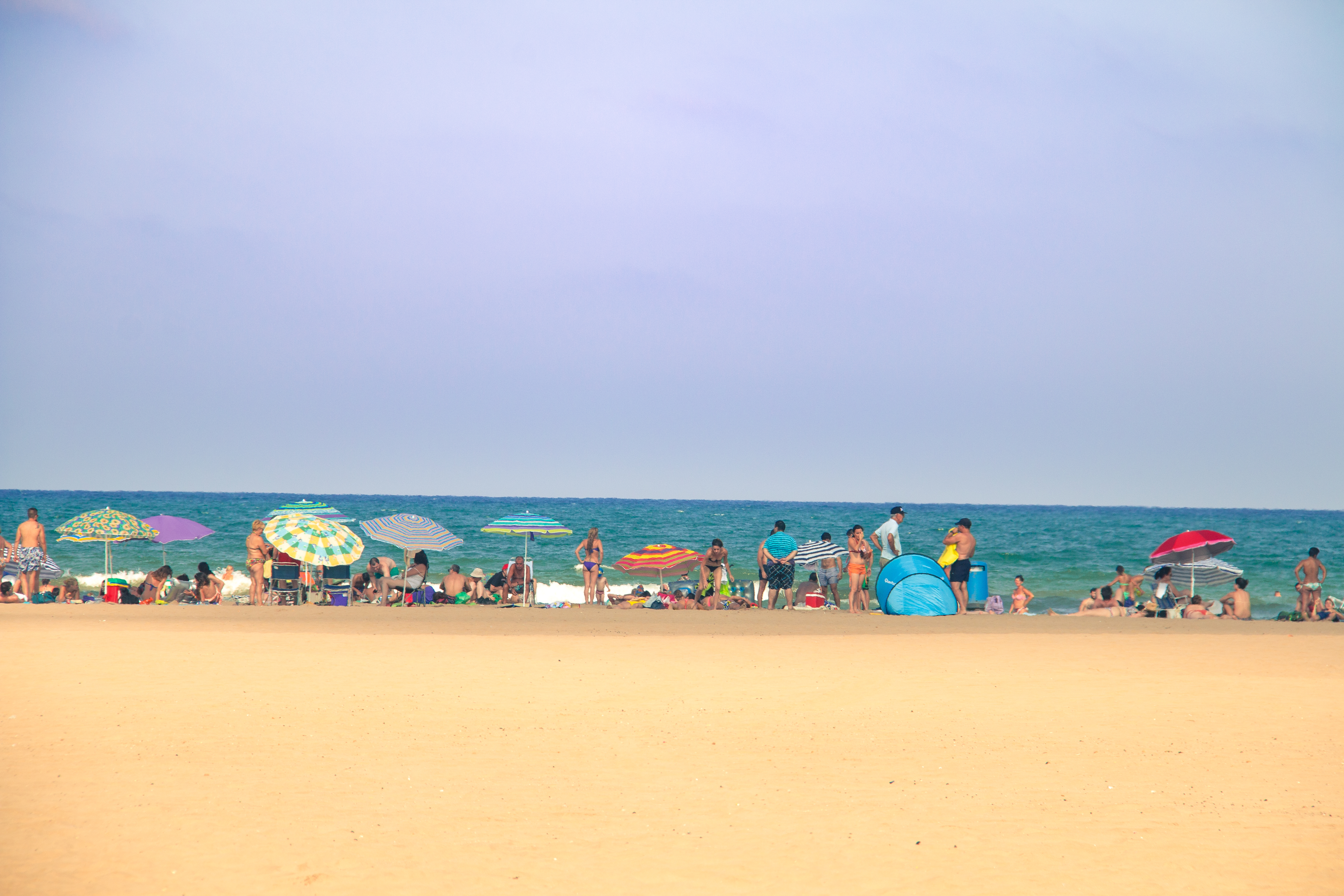
Playa de la Malvarrosa in Valencia

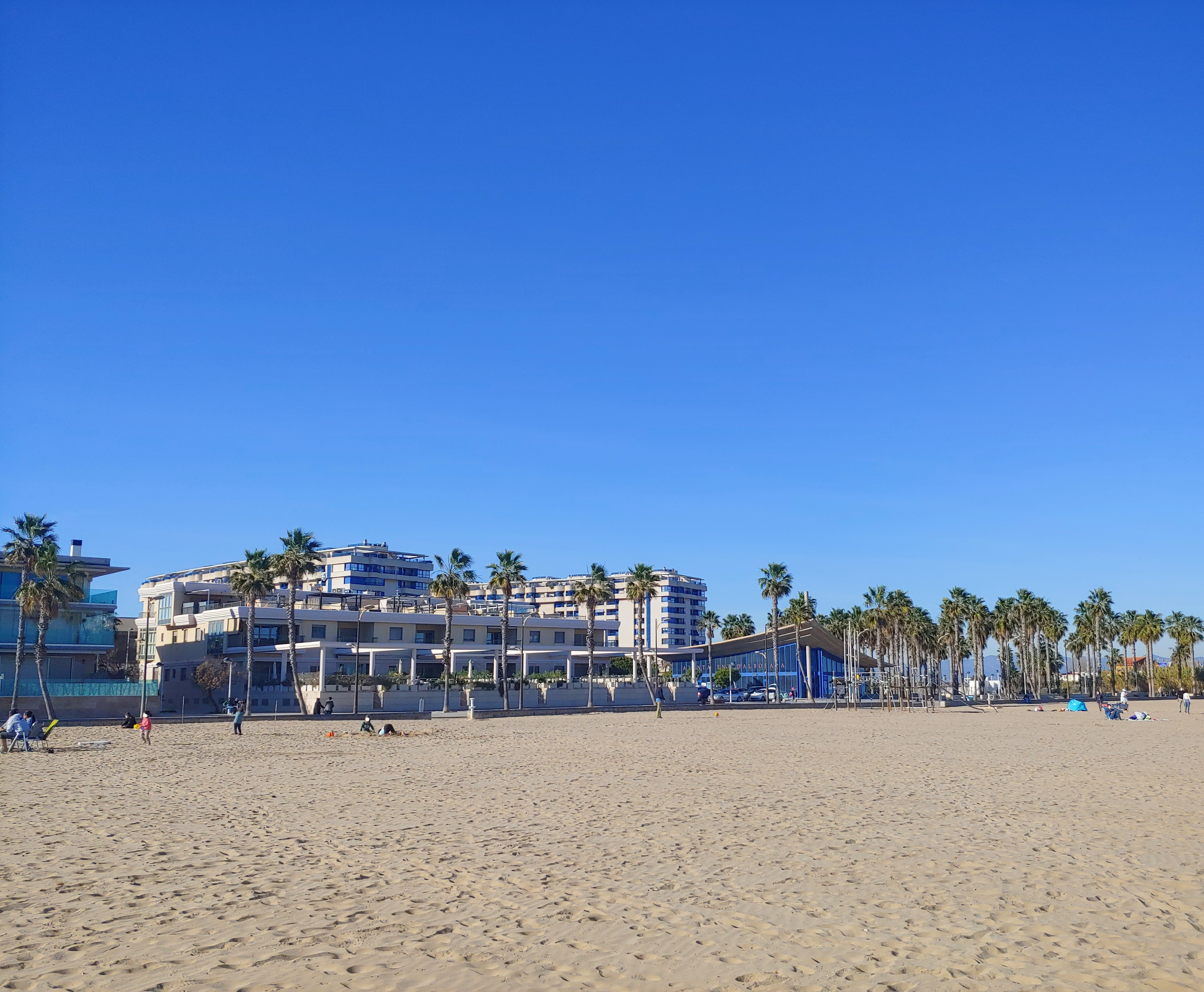
Playa de la Patacona in Valencia in winter

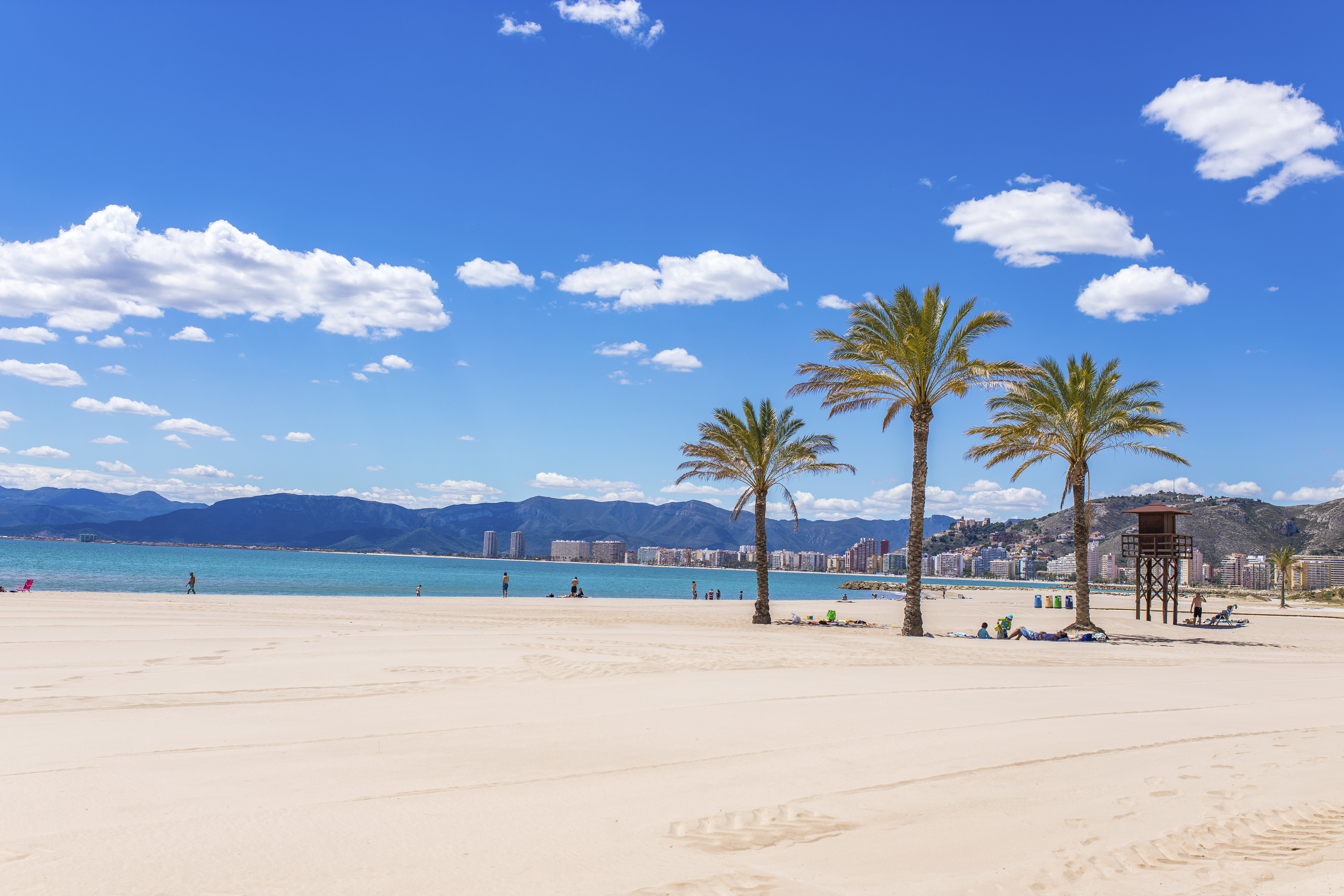
Playa in Cullera

== Localities ==
The localities along the Costa de Valencia are (from north): Sagunto area, Puçol, Alboraia, Valencia, Cullera, Gandia area, Oliva area.

== Beaches ==
Beaches of Costa de Valencia, from north:

- Playa de Corinto-Malvarrosa
- Playa de Almardá
- Playa de Canet
- Playa del Puerto de Sagunto
- Playa de Puzol
- Playa Canina
- Platja Pedretes
- Platja del Puig
- Platja de la Pobla de Farnals
- Playa de Masalfasar
- Playa de Port Saplaya Norte
- Playa de Port Saplaya Sur
- Playa de la Patacona
- Playa de la Malvarrosa
- Playa del Cabañal
- Playa de la Devesa del Saler
- Playa de Pinedo
- Playa de l'Arbre del Gos
- Platja de la Creu
- Playa del Saler
- Playa dels Ferros
- Platja de València
- Playa de La Garrofera
- Playa De La Devesa Del Saler
- Platja de la Punta
- Playa Recatí
- Playa de El Perellonet
- Platja del Perelló
- Playa del Pouet
- Playa de Les Palmeres
- Playa de Bega de Mar
- Platja del Mareny de Vilches
- Playa de Mareny de Sant Llorenç
- Platja Cdad. Luz
- Playa Dossel
- Playa de San Antonio (Cullera)

== See also ==
- Albufera de València
