= Serra d'Irta =

Mountain in Valencia, Spain

Sierra de Irta/Serra d'Irta
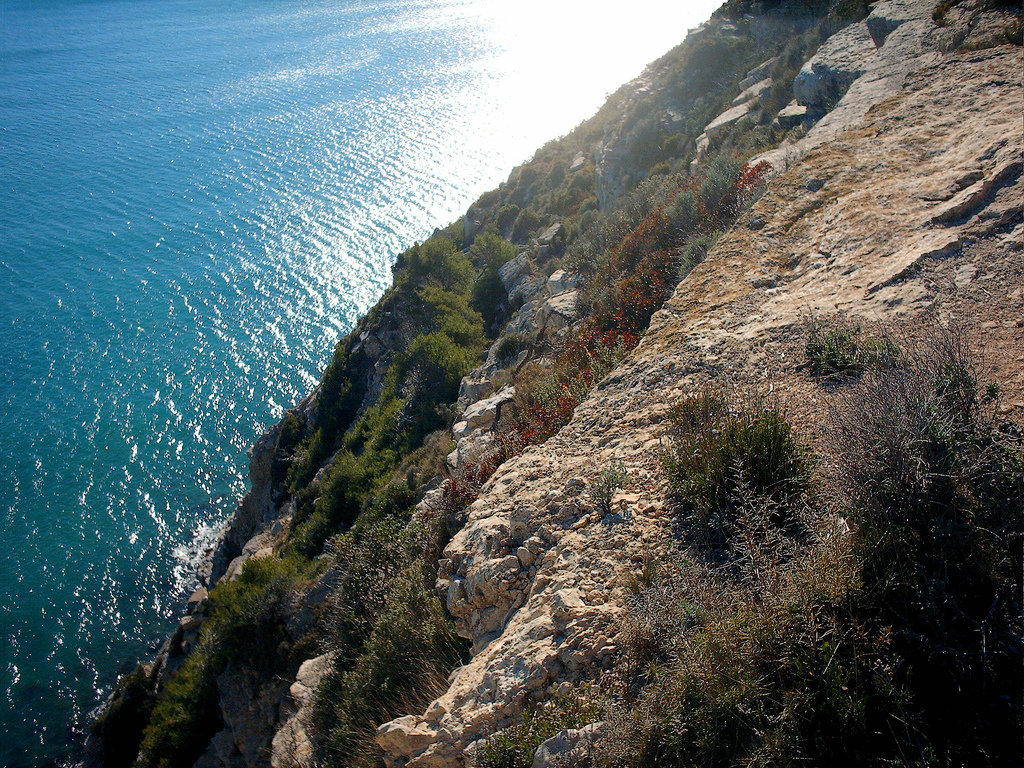

Highest point
- Elevation: 573 m (1,880 ft)
- Listing: List of mountains in the Valencian Community
- Coordinates: 40°19′52″N 0°19′09″E

Geography
- Location within Spain
- Location: Baix Maestrat, Valencian Community
- Parent range: Mediterranean System, Southern zone

Geology
- Mountain type: karstic

Climbing
- Easiest route: drive from Alcocéber or Peñíscola

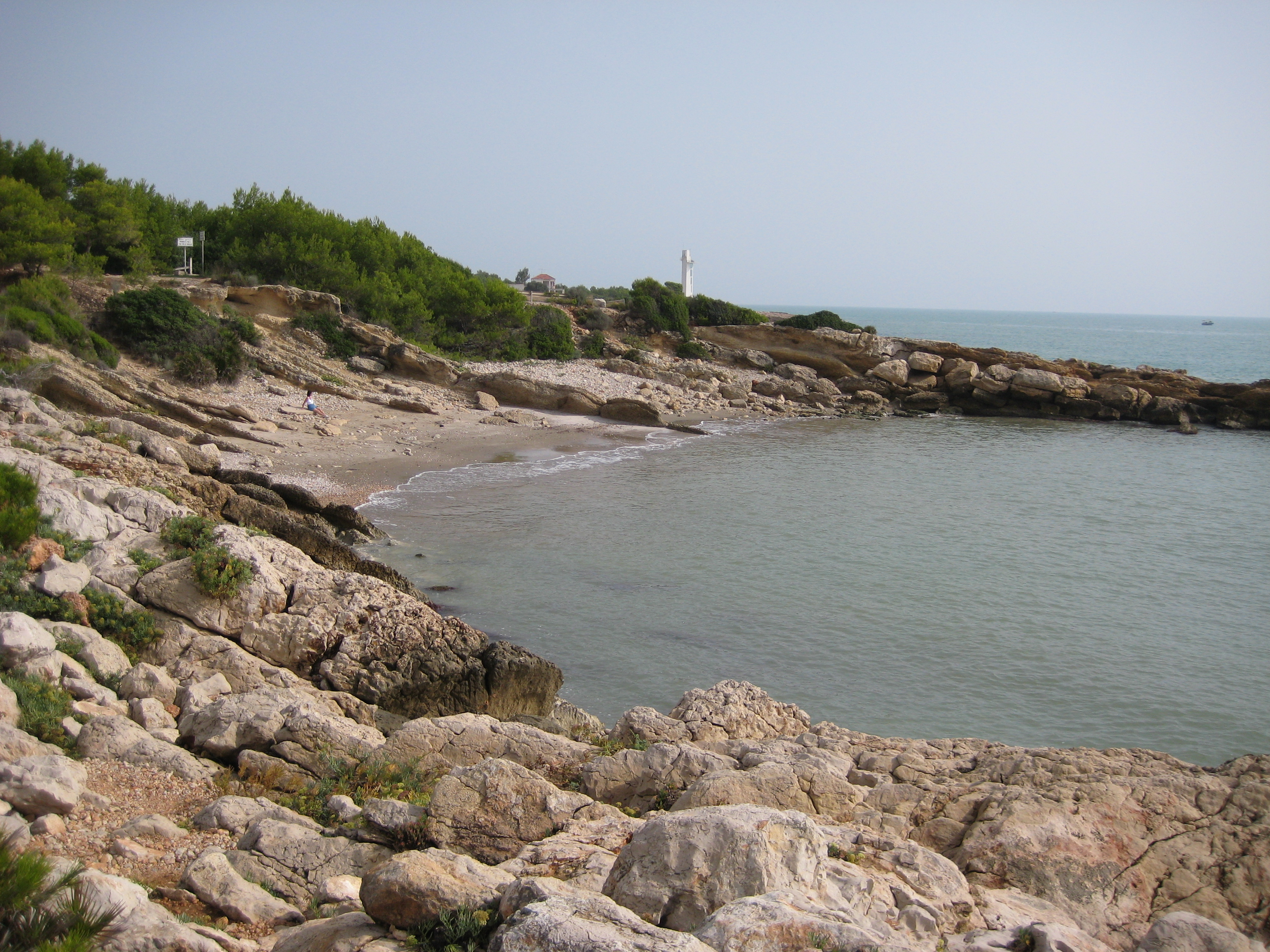
Sierra de Irta rising behind Cala Blanca, Alcocéber.

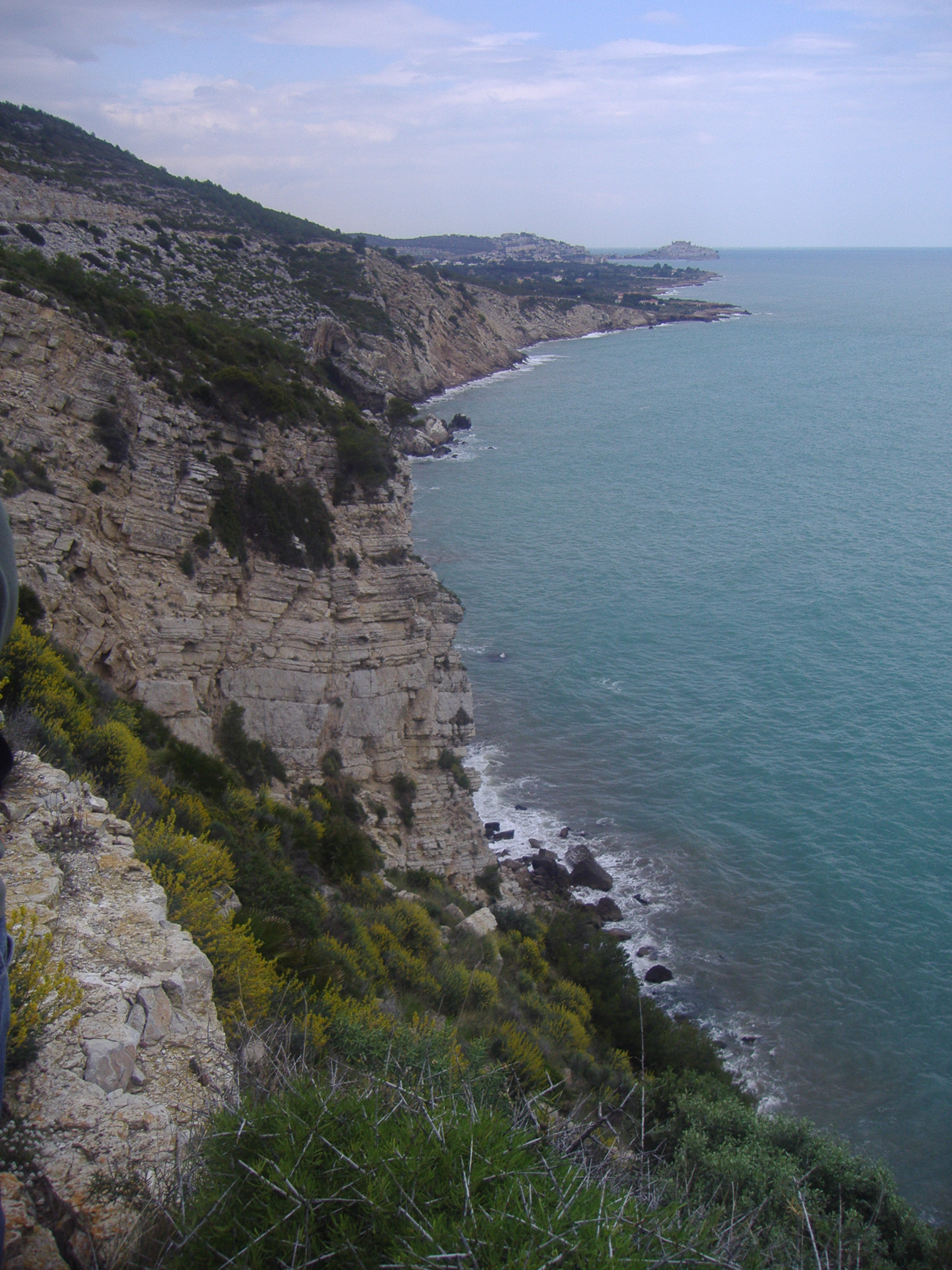
Sierra de Irta cliffs over the Mediterranean and Peñíscola headland in the background.

Serra d'Irta (Valencian pronunciation: [ˈsɛra ˈðiɾta], Spanish: Sierra de Irta) is an 18.8 km long mountain range in the Baix Maestrat comarca, Valencian Community, Spain. Its highest point is Pico Campanelles (573 m).

== Location ==
The Serra d'Irta stretches in a northeast-southwest direction south of the Vinaròs plain, its northern limit. It is located right by the Mediterranean coastline, rising on the eastern side of the road between Barcelona and Valencia. Its southern limit is near Alcossebre.

This mountain range is covered with Maquis shrubland, including Juniperus oxycedrus, Calicotome spinosa, Pistacia lentiscus and Anthyllis cytisoides shrubs. Some of the lower slopes facing inland are planted with olive, almond and carob trees. In spite of the mountain area having been officially declared a Natural Park, there has been heavy urbanization on the slopes of the mountain having a sea view towards the northern end of the range next to Peníscola. There are castles and watchtowers of Moorish times on peaks of the Serra d'Irta both east of Santa Magdalena de Polpís and of Alcalà de Xivert. The most important watchtower is Torre Badum.

== Geology ==
The Serra d'Irta is a karstic formation with numerous shafts and caves. It is a southern prolongation of the Catalan Pre-Coastal Range that formed 25 million years ago as part of the Alpine orogeny. Geologically the section formed by the Serra d'Irta - Santa Magdalena de Polpís/Alcalà de Xivert Valley - Talaies d'Alcalà is very similar to the section formed by the Serra del Montsià - Ulldecona/Freginals Valley - Serra de Godall further north. These sets of parallel mountain ranges and valleys form the transition between the Catalan Mediterranean System and the Iberian System.

== See also ==
- Mountains of the Valencian Community
- Natural Park of Serra d'Irta, a protected area located in the range and the coastal area in front of it
