= Jabalquinto =

Jabalquinto, Spain
- city
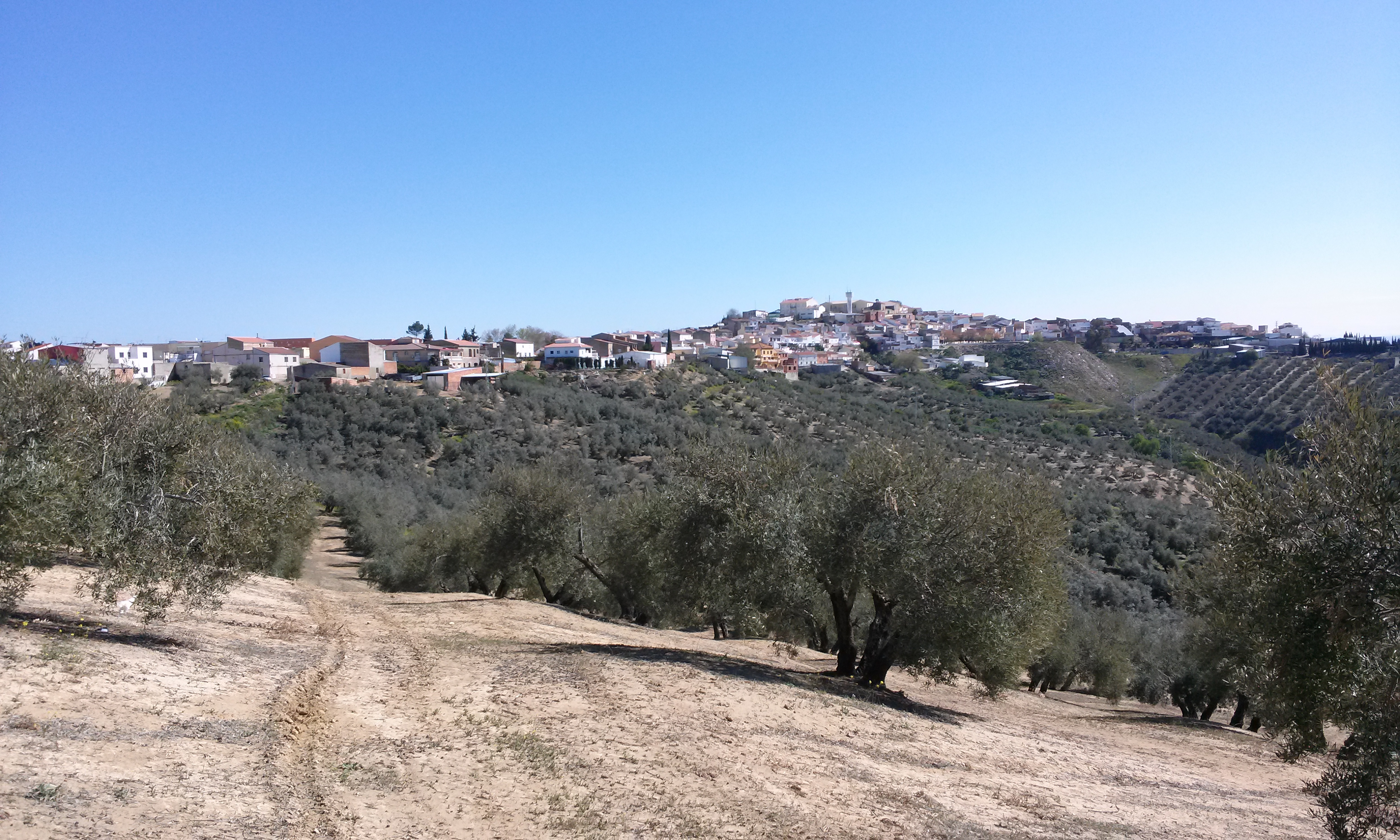

- Coat of arms

- Location in the Province of Jaén Jabalquinto (Andalusia) Jabalquinto (Spain)
- Coordinates: 38°01′N 3°43′W
- Country: Spain
- Autonomous community: Andalusia
- Province: Jaén
- Municipality: Jabalquinto

Area
  - Total: 72 km^{2} (28 sq mi)
- Elevation: 496 m (1,627 ft)

Population (2025-01-01)
  - Total: 1,939
  - Density: 27/km^{2} (70/sq mi)
- Time zone: UTC+1 (CET)
  - Summer (DST): UTC+2 (CEST)

Jabalquinto is a city located in the province of Jaén, Spain. According to the 2005 census (INE), the city has a population of 2,420 inhabitants.

== See also ==
- List of municipalities in Jaén
