= Santa Magdalena de Polpís =

- Municipality
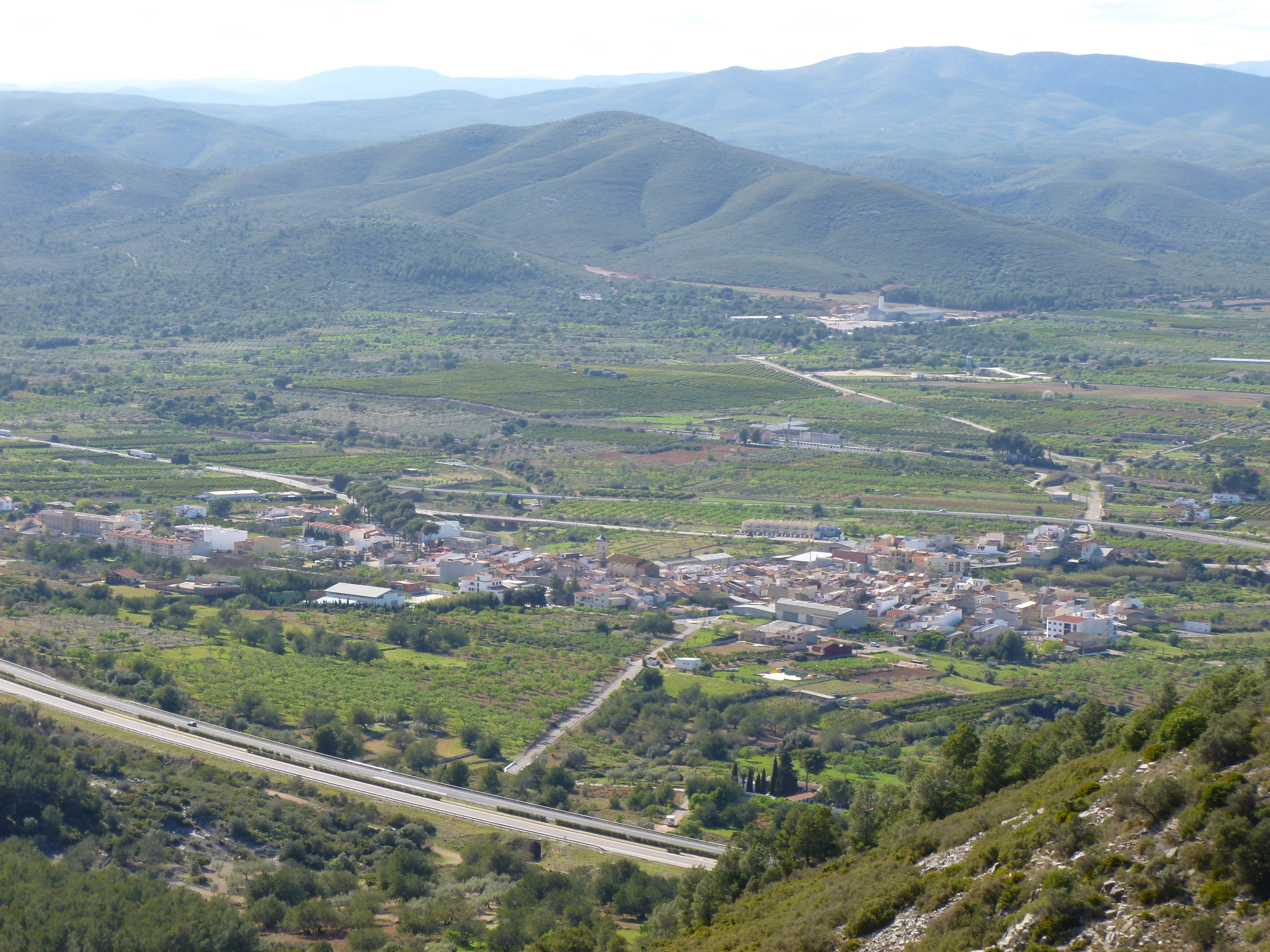

- Coat of arms

- Location in Spain
- Coordinates: 40°21′21″N 0°18′10″E
- Country: Spain
- Autonomous community: Valencian Community
- Province: Castelló
- Comarca: Baix Maestrat
- Judicial district: Vinaròs

Area
  - Total: 66.5 km^{2} (25.7 sq mi)
- Elevation: 123 m (404 ft)

Population (2025-01-01)
  - Total: 771
  - Density: 11.6/km^{2} (30.0/sq mi)
- Demonym(s): Magdalener, Magdalenera
- Time zone: UTC+1 (CET)
  - Summer (DST): UTC+2 (CEST)
- Postal code: 12597
- Official language(s): Valencian

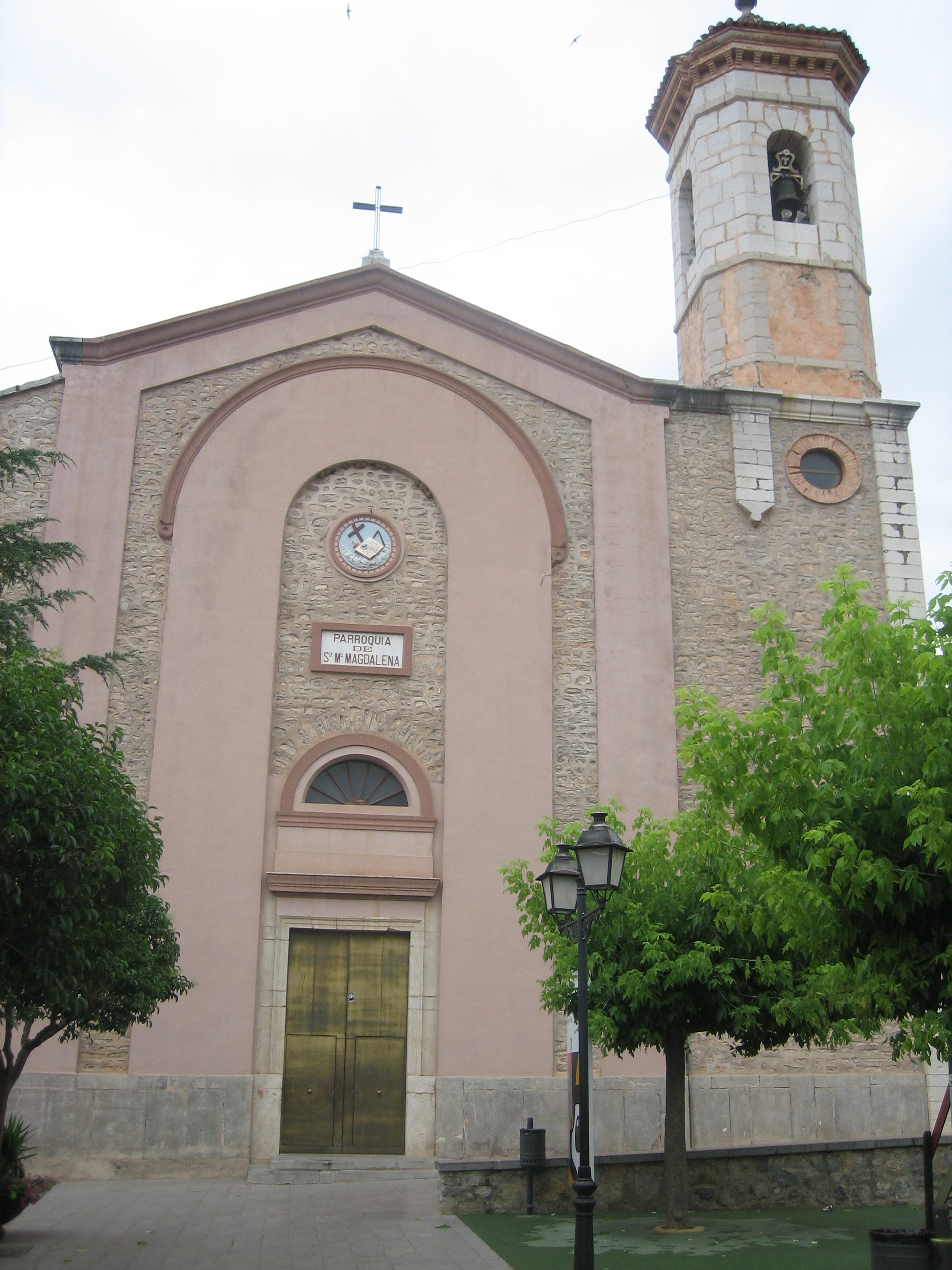
The church façade at Santa Magdalena de Polpís.

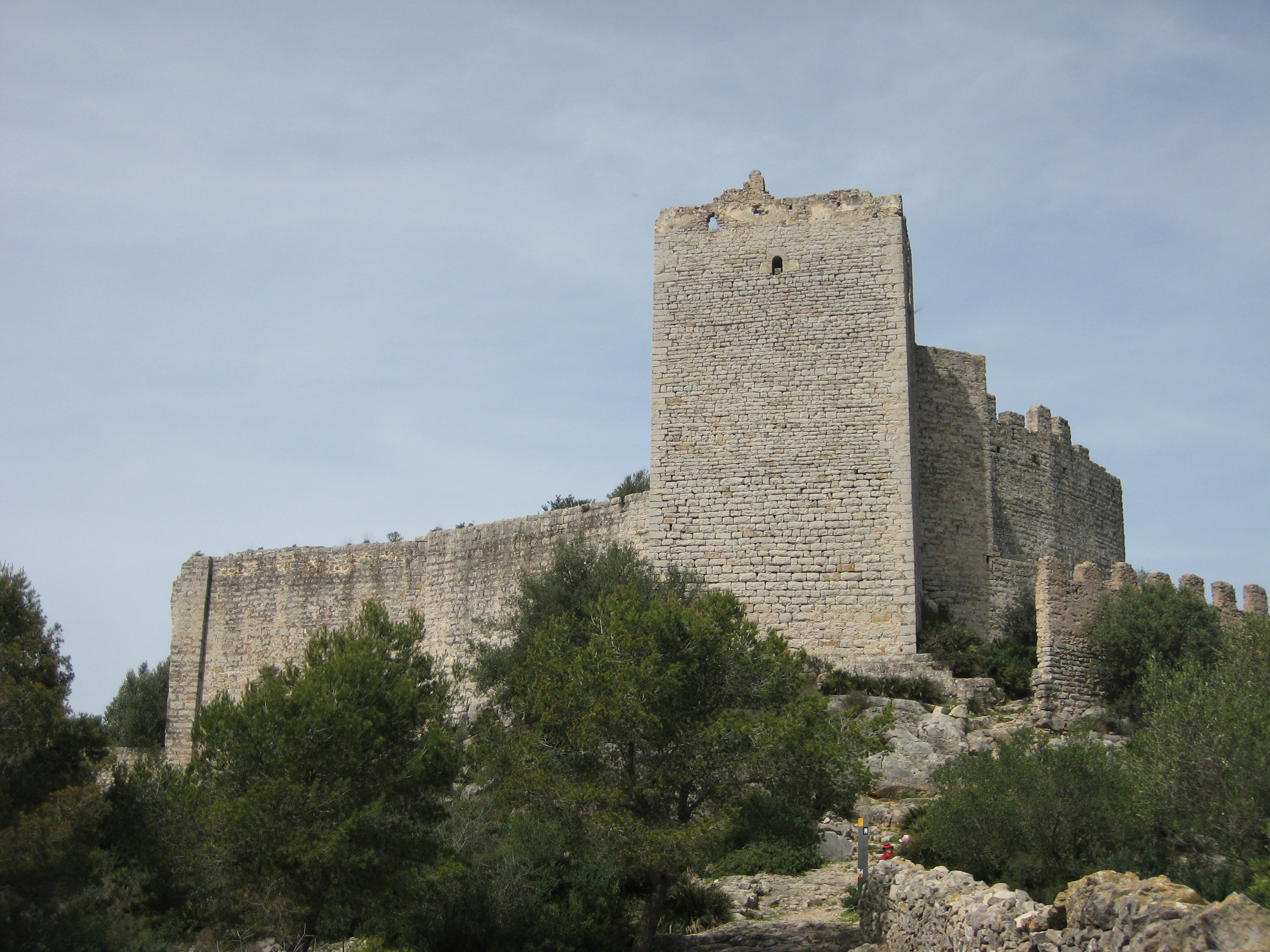
The castle of Santa Magdalena de Polpís seen from the southeast.

Santa Magdalena de Polpís (Valencian pronunciation: [ˈsanta maɡdaˈlena ðe polˈpis], Spanish: Santa Magdalena de Pulpis) is a town and municipality in the Baix Maestrat comarca, province of Castelló, Valencian Community, Spain.

The town is located inland in a flat valley between the two mountain ranges of Serra d'Irta and Serra de les Talaies. It is a rural dryland farming town with only marginal industrial activity, where the main cultivation is olive, almond and carob trees, as well as some orange trees in irrigated patches. There is no river in the valley, instead the water emerges in natural ponds known as basses.

The main celebration in Santa Magdalena de Polpís is the Festes patronals in honor of Saint Mary Magdalene.

== History ==
Like neighboring Alcalà de Xivert its castle was an important bulwark in Moorish times and a village developed at the feet of the castle, eventually giving origin to the present-day town.

Santa Magdalena de Polpís suffered much during the Spanish Civil War (1936–1939) when the fascist troops tried to split the Spanish Republican government territory in two and reach the Mediterranean coast cutting across the Talaies.

At the same time, under the influence of anarcho-communist ideas, the town completely abolished money. "Everyone works and everyone has the right to get what one needs for free. One just goes to the store where all the foodstuffs and other necessities are supplied" - says a local resident. Everything was distributed for free, with only a record of who took what, allowing the community to distribute resources equally in times of scarcity and generally ensuring transparency.
