= Alcalà de Xivert =

Alcalà de Xivert Alcalá de Chivert
- Municipality
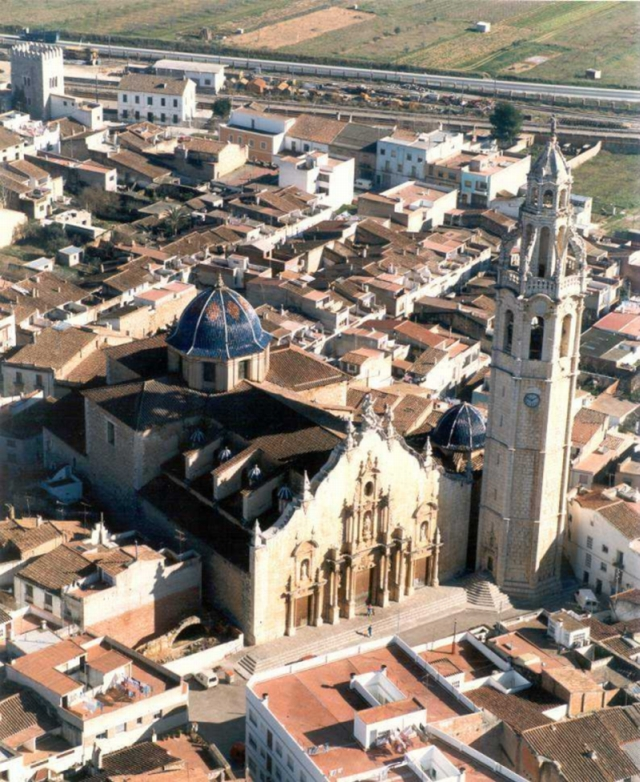
- Church of Saint John the Baptist surrounded by Alcalà de Xivert

- Coat of arms

- Location in Spain
- Coordinates: 40°18′15″N 0°13′32″E
- Country: Spain
- Autonomous community: Valencian Community
- Province: Castelló
- Comarca: Plana Alta
- Judicial district: Castelló de la Plana

Area
  - Total: 167.5 km^{2} (64.7 sq mi)
- Elevation: 155 m (509 ft)

Population (2025-01-01)
  - Total: 7,349
  - Density: 43.87/km^{2} (113.6/sq mi)
- Demonyms: Xivertí, xivertina
- Time zone: UTC+1 (CET)
  - Summer (DST): UTC+2 (CEST)
- Postal code: 12570
- Official language(s): Valencian

Alcalà de Xivert (Valencian: [alkaˈla ðe tʃiˈvɛɾt]; Spanish: Alcalá de Chivert [alkaˈla ðe tʃiˈβeɾ]) is a town and municipality in the Baix Maestrat comarca, province of Castelló, Valencian Community, Spain.

== Geography ==
The main town is located inland in a flat valley between the two mountain ranges of Serra d'Irta and Serra de les Talaies. There is no river in the valley; instead, the water emerges in natural ponds known as basses.

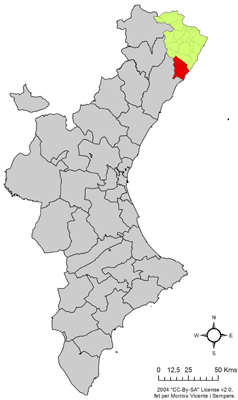
Localisation of Alcalà de Xivert in the Valencian Community

== History ==
Its castle occupied a strong position for the control of the routes along the Mediterranean coast. Here stood a Moorish castle (the name of the town derives from Arabic al-qalat = "the castle") that was captured by James I of Aragon in 1234, who also resettled the place with Christian villagers.

On 30 August 1905, scientists came from all over the world to Alcalà de Xivert to watch a total solar eclipse which covered an area from the coast of North Africa to the North-East of Spain.

In contemporary times the economy of the town is devoted mainly to tourism, with several beaches and a busy marina at the villages located on the coast, Alcossebre, Capicorb and Les Fonts.

== Villages ==
- Alcalà de Xivert, 3,971
- Alcossebre, 2,151
- Capicorb, 260
- Les Fonts, 1,502

== Sites of interest ==
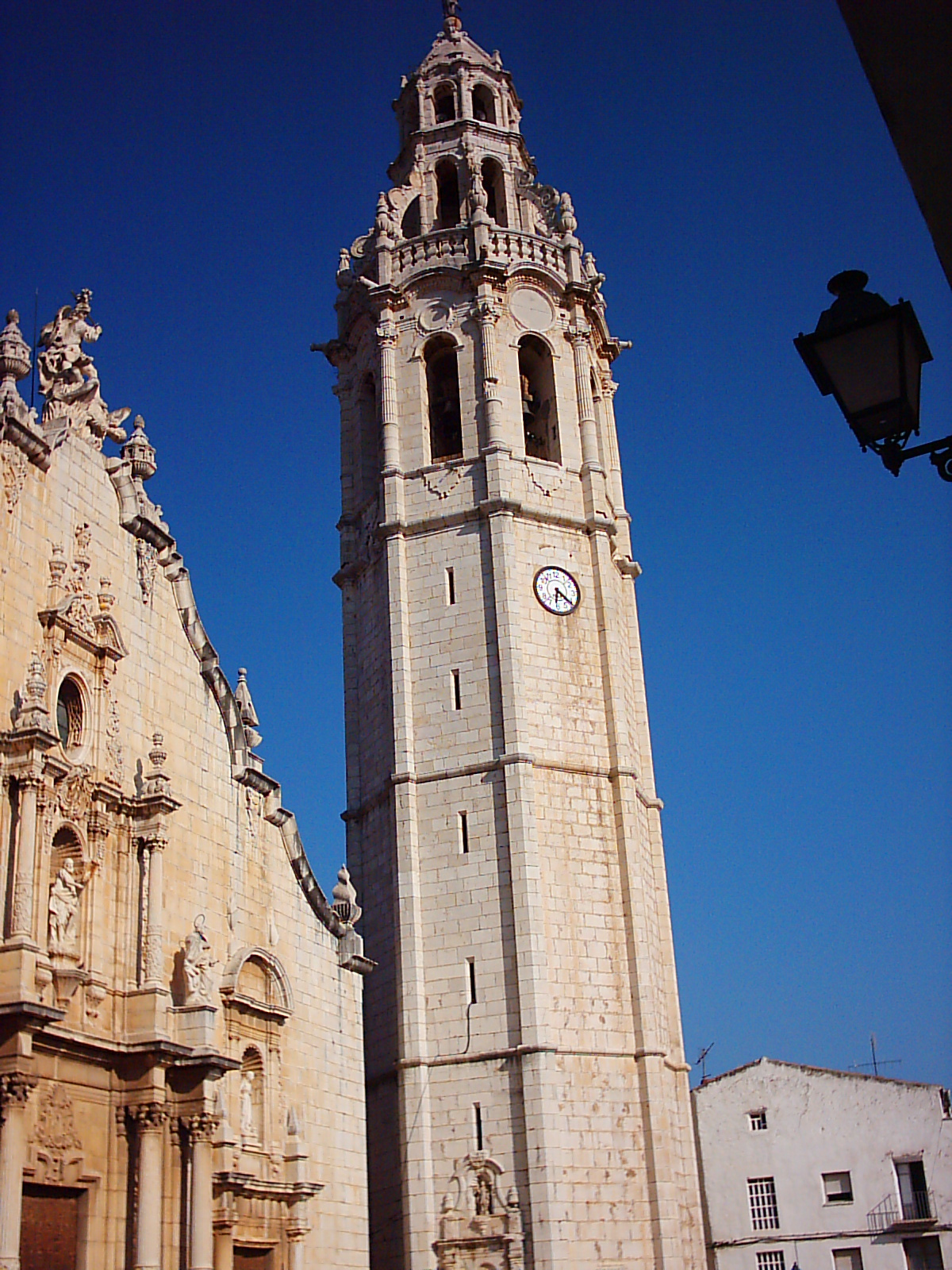
The bell-tower of the main church at Alcalà de Xivert.

The landmark of the town is the Esglèsia de Sant Joan Baptista (Church of Saint John the Baptist), built in 1736–1766, with a large dome, a noteworthy Baroque portal, and a 68-metre-high tower, which is visible from many miles away.

The castle of Xivert, was built by the Moors in the 12th century and later conquered by the Knights Templar.

== See also ==
- List of municipalities in Castellón
