= Costa del Azahar =

Region of coast of Castellón, Spain

Coordinates: 39.7°N 0.2°W

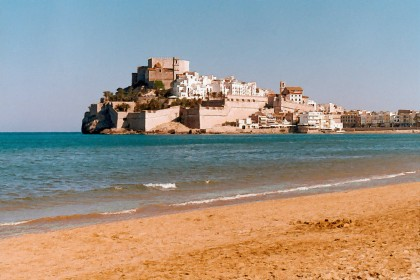
Peníscola

Costa del Azahar (Spanish: [ˈkosta ðel aθaˈaɾ], literally 'Orange Blossom Coast'; Valencian: Costa dels Tarongers [ˈkɔsta ðels taɾoɲˈdʒeɾs], also [ˈkɔstɔ ðels taɾoɲˈdʒeɾs], literally 'Coast of the Orange Trees') is the name for the coast of the province of Castellón in the Valencian Community, Spain. To its north is the Costa Daurada (Costa Dorada) and to the south lies the Costa de Valencia (Costa de València).

Towns on the Costa del Azahar include Peniscola (Peñíscola / Peníscola), Benicarló, Oropesa del Mar (Orpesa), Moncofa (Moncófar), Benicàssim (Benicasim) and Castellón de la Plana (Castelló de la Plana).

== Bibliography ==
- Gran Enciclopèdia Catalana
- Guide to yacht clubs and marinas in Spain: Costa Blanca, Costa del Azahar, Islas Baleares. Madrid: Ministry of Transportation, Tourism and Communications, General Office of the Secretary of Tourism, General Office of Tourism Companies and Activities. 1987.
