= Desert de les Palmes Natural Park =

Nature preserve in Spain

Desierto de Las Palmas Desert de les Palmes
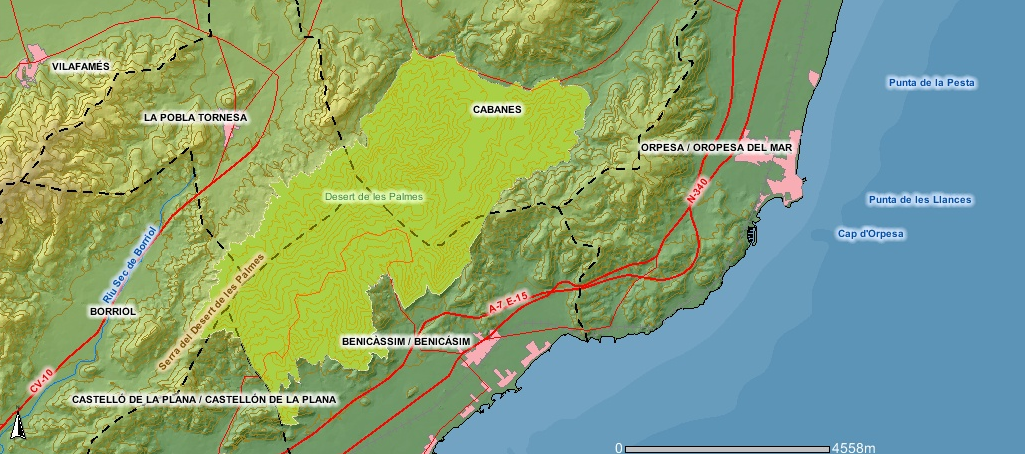
- Map of the Desert of the Palms Park
- Interactive map of Desierto de Las Palmas; Desert de les Palmes
- Location: Valencian Community, Spain
- Nearest city: Benicàssim
- Coordinates: 40.081°N 0.037°E
- Area: 3,293 ha (8,140 acres)
- Established: October 16, 1989
- Governing body

The Desert de les Palmes Nature Reserve (Spanish: Parque Natural del Desierto de Las Palmas, Valencian: Desert de les Palmes) is a nature preserve in the province of Castellón, in the Valencian Community, Spain.

== Basic information ==
The 3,293 hectare area was declared a nature preserve by the valencian government on October 16, 1989. The area burned on numerous occasions in 1985 and 1992, which is why there is little wild forest there. The name of the preserve comes from the historical presence of a religious order of Carmelita Mendicants. This order calls spaces that are dedicated to spiritual retreat "holy deserts" (los "Santos Desiertos"). The second part of the name comes from the abundance of palms (Chamaerops humilis) in the area. Chamaerops are the only palm endemic to Europe.

== Municipalities ==
- Benicàssim
- Borriol
- Cabanes
- Castellón de la Plana
- La Pobla Tornesa

== Image gallery ==
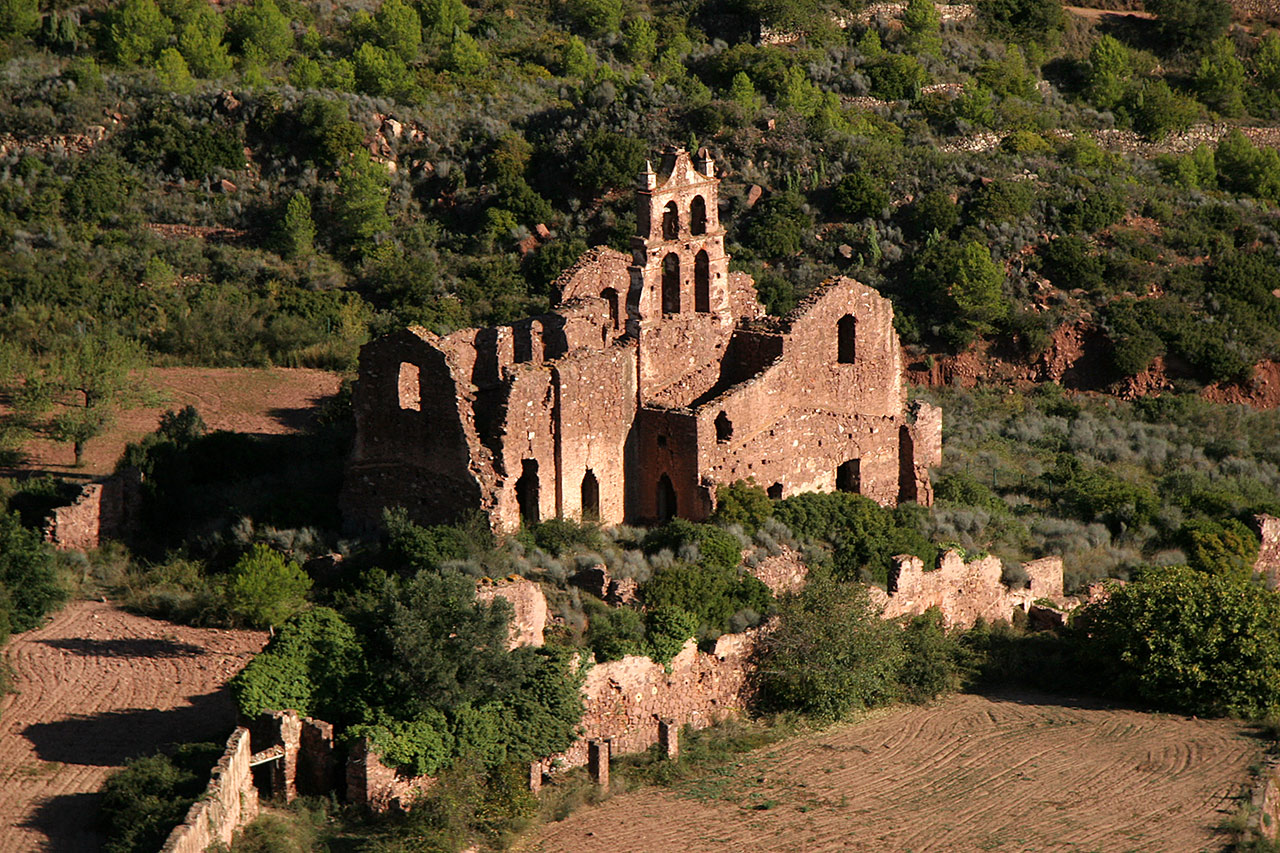
Ancient monastery (in ruins).

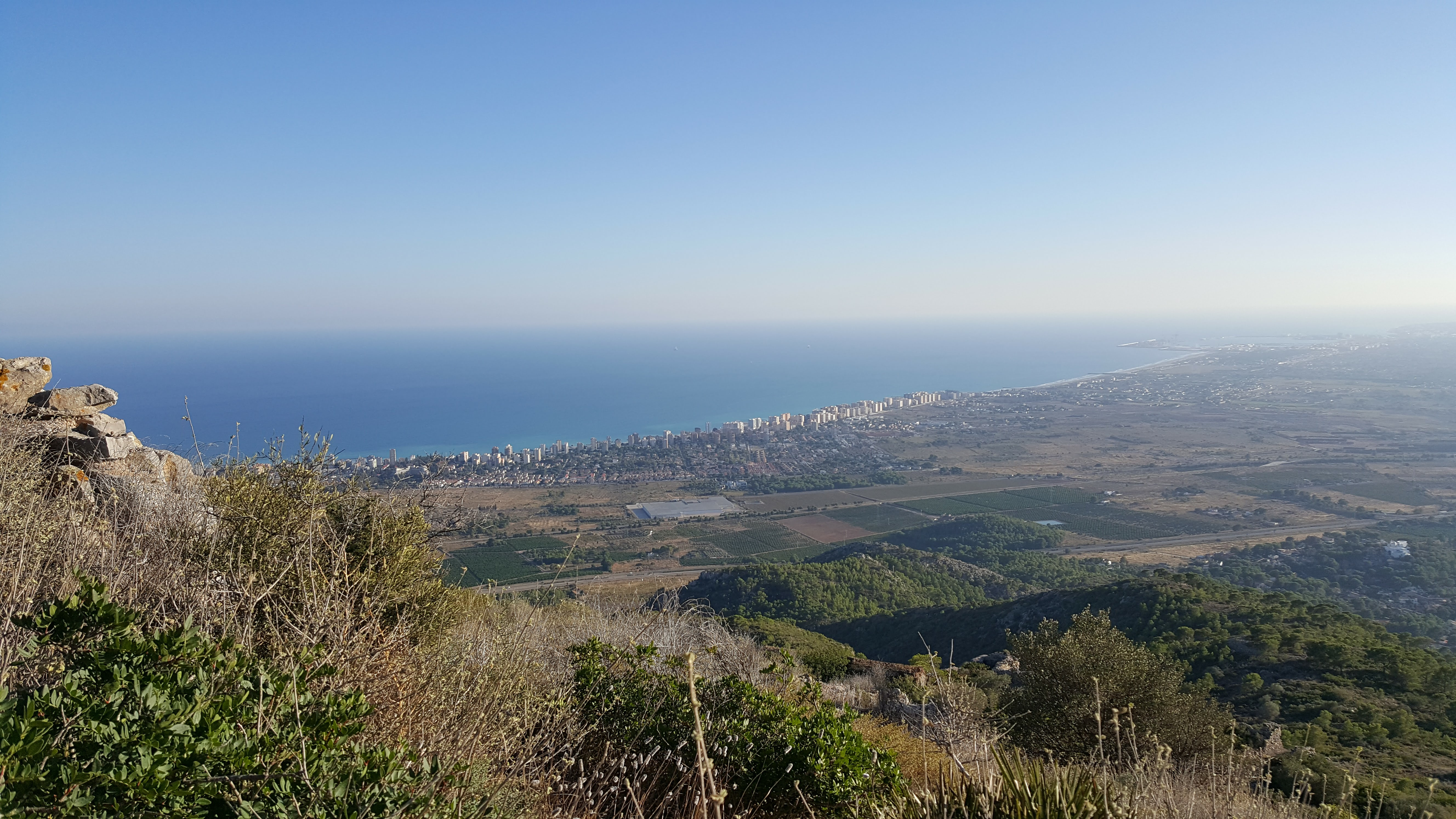
View of Benicàssim and the Mediterranean Sea from the park.

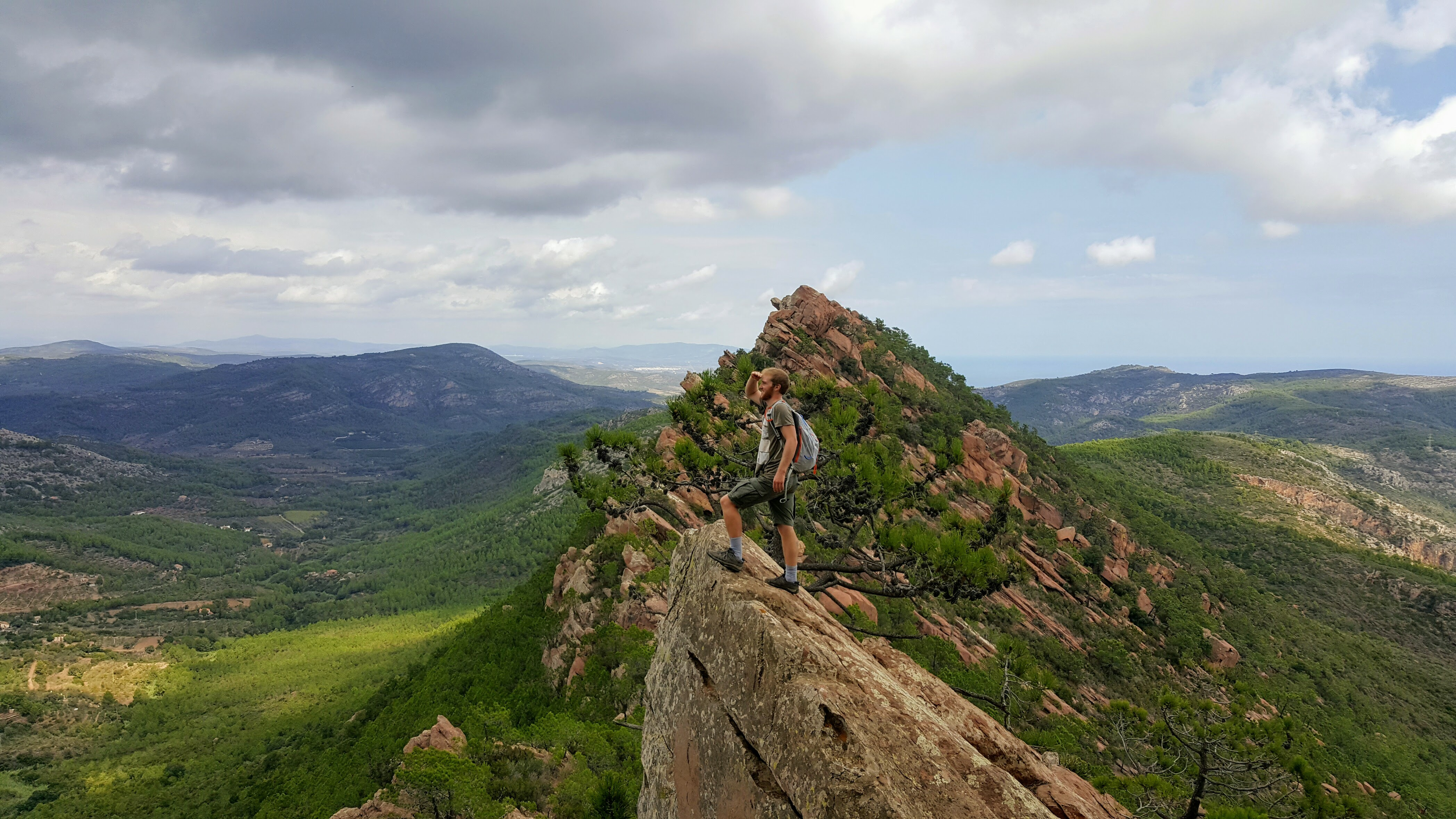
Mountainous rock formations (popular hiking destination).
