= Vince Power =

Irish music venue and festival owner (1947–2024)

Vince Power CBE
- Born: John Vincent Power; 29 April 1947; Waterford, County Waterford, Ireland
- Died: 9 March 2024 (aged 76); London, England

John Vincent Power CBE (29 April 1947 – 9 March 2024) was an Irish music venue and festival owner, and the founder of Mean Fiddler who lived and operated mainly in London.

== Biography ==
John Vincent Power was born in Kilmacthomas, County Waterford on 29 April 1947, one of eleven children. Power had enrolled to go to his local agricultural college at 16, instead he took the boat to Britain and travelled to Hemel Hempstead where his aunt lived. He found work at Woolworths but became homesick and returned home to Ireland. A few months later, returning with a friend, he arrived in Kilburn, London during 1963, the time known as the Swinging Sixties, a decade that saw an estimated 100,000 Irish people, travel to Britain seeking employment.

Power worked in various manual labour jobs before his move into the demolition of tenement slums, where he often came upon abandoned second hand furniture and identified an opportunity that he could profit from. He branched out into house clearance, his flair for advertising helped give him regular sales and turnover of stock. His several shops by now, were stocked with affordable and used furniture for a ready market in North West London. The success of the businesses and the income they generated allowed him to also pursue his main passion, music, more specifically country & western music.

A trip to Tennessee triggered his desire to bring the sound of Nashville to London, prompting Power to acquire and open the original Mean Fiddler, his first country and western club, which opened in 1982, within a former boxing gym in Harlesden. It soon became a key music venue attracting up and coming talent, Irish music and country stars. It was there that his music empire was founded and was soon expanded to eight major music festivals, 14 live music venues and a string of successful nightclubs and restaurants, once valued at £60 million. Power's background in authentic music saw him promote, book and re-book many famous artists of the rock and roll era including Bob Dylan, Van Morrison, Roy Orbison, Paul Weller Johnny Cash, Paul McCartney and Neil Young.

Power was seen by some as a controversial figure and he was impatient to change the way the British live music scene, of the time was organised. His hands on business approach gave him easy access to agents and musicians. He developed a skill of spotting niche gaps in the market that saw him outpace his competitors. Building his reputation he formed productive relationships with brewers and financiers and he was to earn the affectionate nickname of 'The Godfather of Gigs'. His venue quickly gained a reputation for its Irish music nights, showcasing new bands such as The Pogues and Billy Bragg. Within five years The Mean Fiddler was staging high-profile gigs with big name artists such as Roy Orbison, who was to play his last ever UK gig there, in 1987.

By the late 1980s, it had become a showcase venue for new and established talent within the capital's expanding live music scene. It was the springboard for expansion into other venues and bars and created an opportunity for the Mean Fiddler Group (MFG) with Power at the helm, to dominate the UK outdoor music festival market. He acquired the Finsbury Park Astoria, the Kentish Town Forum, the Highbury Garage, the Camden Jazz Café and the Subterania in London. Aside from the Reading and Leeds festival, the organisation also promoted the London Fleadh, Glasgow Gig On The Green and the Homelands dance festivals. Then in 2001, Home a multi storey venue, in Leicester Square was purchased for £18.5m.

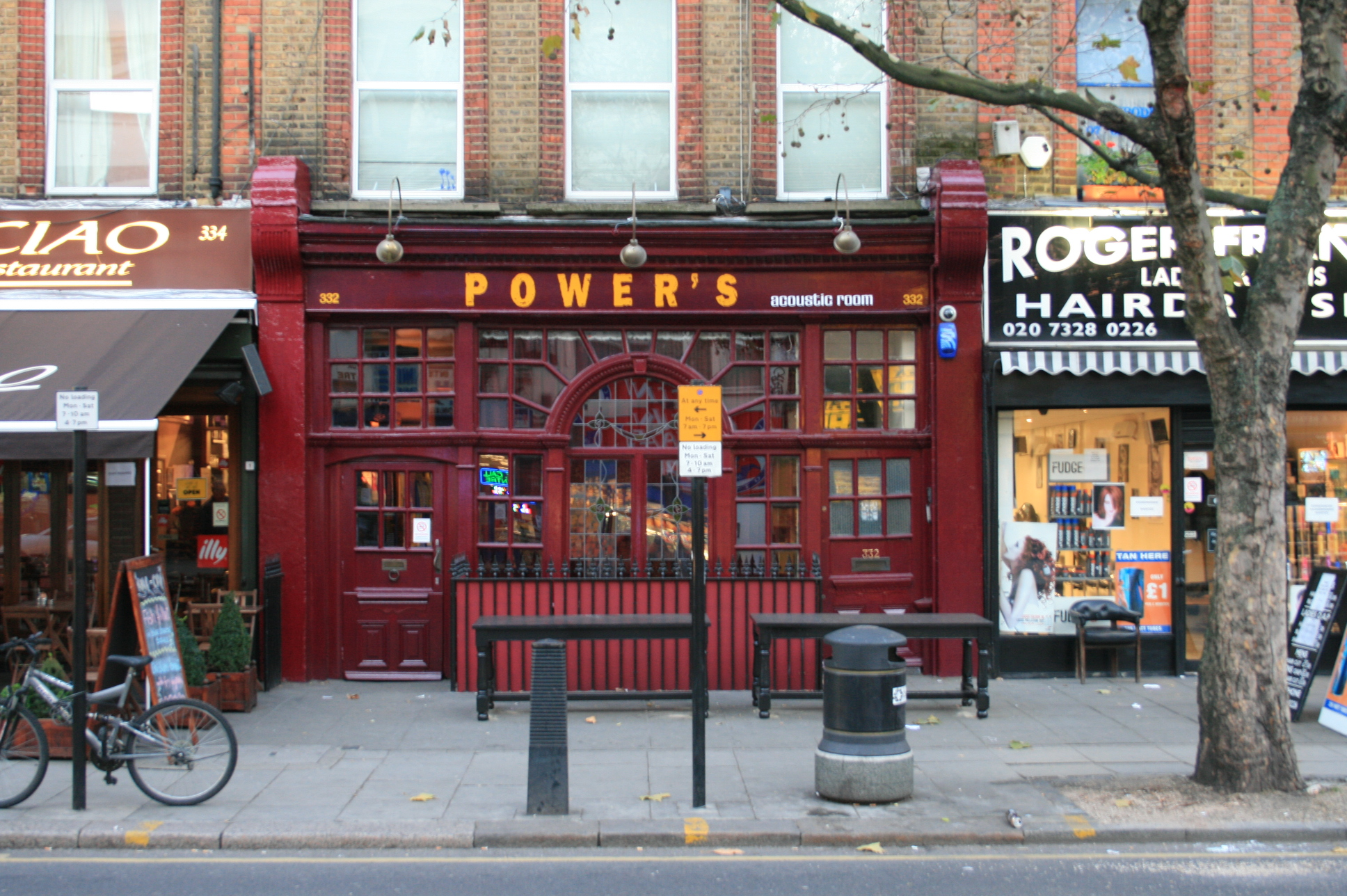
Power's Bar in 2007

In December 1996, Power opened a bar on Kilburn High Road. Initially known as Zincbar and Zn, it had to change its name after Terence Conran won a trademark case. His nearby Power's Bar, a pub and music venue, was managed by his son until it closed in September 2013 after 18 years.

Between 2001 and 2005, Power saw a significant share dilution of his holding in MFG, in return for him receiving payments of at least £13m. By May 2021, he had bought and become involved in the running of Dingwalls in Camden using his management vehicle PowerHaus.

== Personal life ==
Power was the father to eight children. He had moved to London and had worked lived in the capital for most of his life. He died on 9 March 2024, at the age of 76.

== Festivals ==
Power helped popularise festivals in the UK through the rise of Reading, Leeds, The Phoenix, The Fleadh, Madstock, and numerous other one offs including the first Sex Pistols re-union in Finsbury Park.

In 1989, Mean Fiddler took over the organisation of the Reading Festival; acts included New Order, The Pogues, The Wonder Stuff and The Sugarcubes. Power is credited with reversing the fortunes of the long-established event, turning Reading into a highly anticipated and successful fixture on the annual festival calendar.

Power sold his stake in The Mean Fiddler Music Group plc in July 2005, and went on to set up Vince Power Music Group.

Power acquired one of Europe's most celebrated festivals, Benicàssim in 2005. Held in Spain, in a port town and beach resort located in Castelló, on the Costa del Azahar in Spain it is much more than just a music festival. Benicàssim Festival (FIB) sees over 100 acts perform over the four days; with four stages and eight days free camping. The festival is beach by day, music by night and is popular with thousands of UK festival goers who travel to Spain for the 'Glasto del Sol' experience each year. It was voted Best Overseas Festival in 2012 (UK Festival Awards), and features a line-up of international live acts, with a main focus on pop, rock and electronica artists.

Hop Farm Music Festival was launched in 2008 by Power, and has been held annually since at The Hop Farm Country Park in Paddock Wood, Kent, England. After its first year it was nominated for 'Best New Festival' at the UK Festival Awards. The Hop Farm Music Festival was born after a survey conducted among festival fans revealed that they always felt the lowest in priority and importance. The survey resulted in the first Hop Farm Music Festival. In 2008, a 30,000 crowd capacity festival centred on folk and independent music, with a specific aim of a return to "back to basics" organisation with a no sponsorship, no branding, no VIP attitude. Under 12's, since the festival's creation, have had free entry. Previous acts include Blondie, Prince and Peter Gabriel.

In September 2012, Vince Power Music Group entered administration and went into liquidation in November 2012, with a statement claiming "The board has in recent weeks pursued a number of different funding proposals but the company has not been able to procure the necessary funding it requires." Kent Police and artists who appeared at that years Hop Farm Festival, including Primal Scream, Suede and Peter Gabriel were not paid, with the festival's debts totalling more than £4.8 million.

July 2018 saw the launch of Power's new festival Feis, held at the Liverpool Pier Head. Billed as the city's "largest celebration of Irish artists", the line-up included musicians such as Van Morrison, The Chieftains, Imelda May and Shane MacGowan.

=== Festivals ===
Below is a list of some of the festivals Power was involved in running, with Mean Fiddler or as a standalone promoter.

- Reading, Leeds
- Glastonbury
- Phoenix Festival
- Hop Farm Music Festival
- Benicàssim
- Tribal Gathering
- Homelands
- Feis Liverpool
- Fleadh (London, Chicago, San Jose, Boston, New York, Glasgow, Ireland, San Francisco)
- Madstock, Finsbury Park
- Big Love
- Gig on the Green, Glasgow
- NASS (National Adventure Sports Show)
- Jam in the Park

== Charitable work ==
Power was involved in a number of charitable organisations, particularly Cradle, a Bosnian Children's Charity.

Through various fundraising methods, including collections at the festivals, Power had helped to rebuild a primary school in Mostar, and in Thailand following the Tsumani. He was also closely associated with the Phillip Hall Memorial Fund, and was a patron of UNICEF, Human Rights Watch and the Depression Alliance.

== Achievements and awards ==
Power promoted many shows and was involved with many projects at The Roundhouse, and donated to their redevelopment of The Roundhouse which will have the 'Vince Power Music Studio' in his honour as well as being a patron of its Millennial Committee.

In the 2006 Special Honours, Power was appointed an Honorary Commander of the Order of the British Empire (CBE).
