= Desert de les Palmes Range =

Mountain range in Spain

Desert de les Palmes
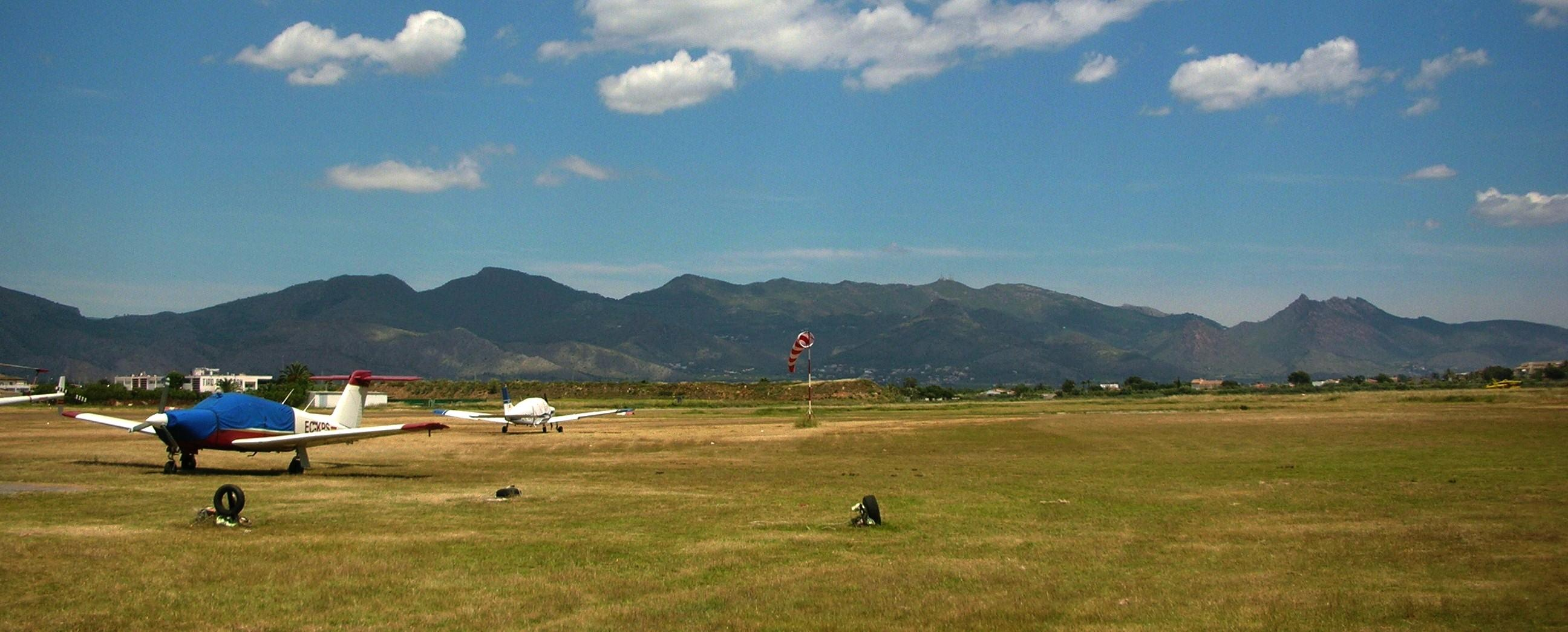
- View of the range from the runway of the Castellón Aero Club

Highest point
- Peak: Bartolo
- Elevation: 729 m (2,392 ft)
- Listing: List of mountains in the Valencian Community
- Coordinates: 40°05′02″N 0°02′27″E

Geography
- Location within Spain
- Location: Plana Alta, Valencian Community
- Parent range: Mediterranean System, Southern zone

Geology
- Mountain type: karstic

Climbing
- Easiest route: drive from Benicàssim

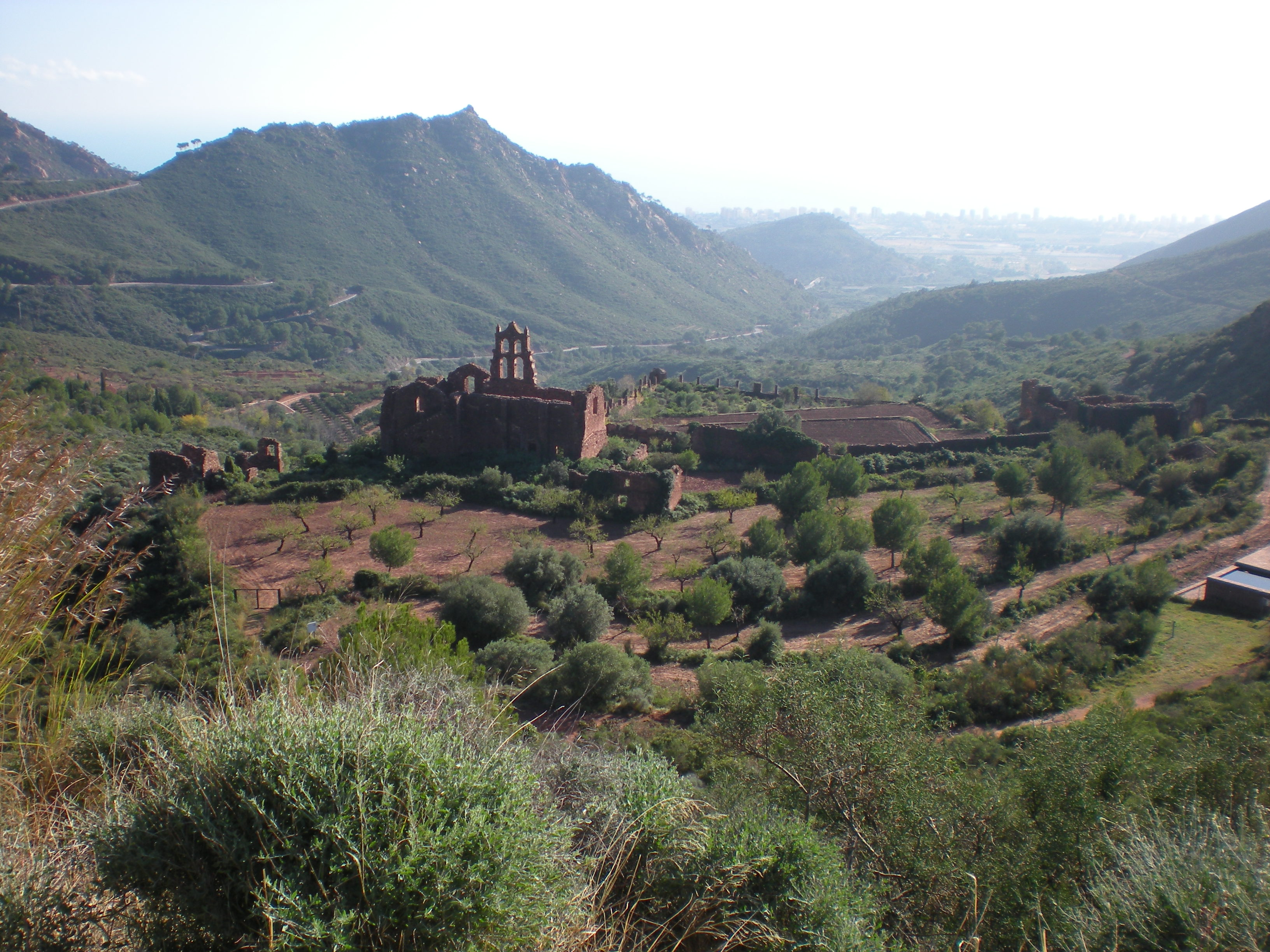
Ancient monastery with empty bell gables in the Desert de les Palmes mountains.

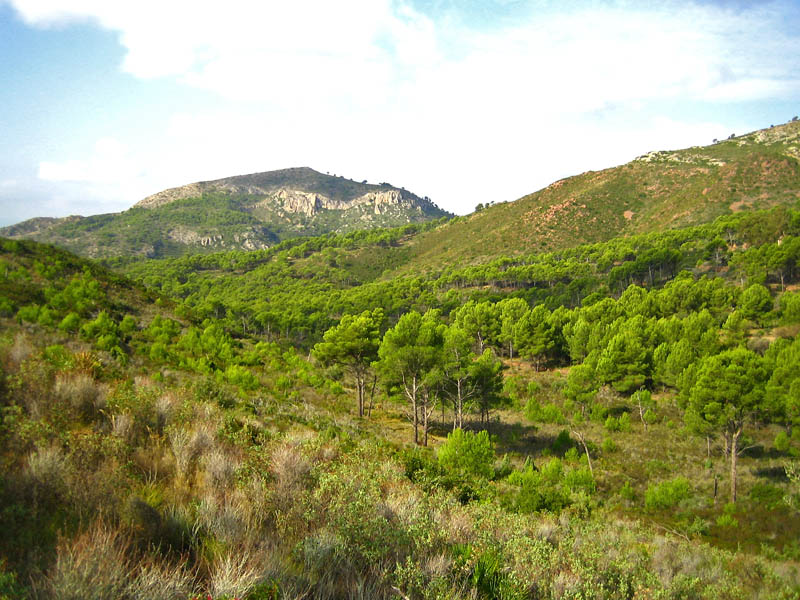
Desert de les Palmes vegetation

Desert de les Palmes (Valencian pronunciation: [deˈzɛɾd de les ˈpalmes], Spanish: Desierto de las Palmas), also known as Serra del Desert de les Palmes, is an 18.8 km long mountain range in the Plana Alta comarca, Valencian Community, Spain. Its highest point is Bartolo (729 m).

The Ermita de La Magdalena 40°02′04″N 0°00′20″W, an important church for Castellonenc people, is located on a hill at the southern end of the range. The Prime Meridian crosses the Desert de les Palmes roughly in the middle.

The Columbretes Islands can be seen on clear days in the horizon looking seaward from the Desert de les Palmes heights.

== Origin of the name ==
Desert, the name of the range, originated in an ancient eremitical settlement or hermitage, known in Catalan as Desert, that was located in the mountain range.

Palmes on the other hand refers to the abundance of Chamaerops humilis palms in the range. Short, stocky, and growing in clumps, Chamaerops humilis is the only palm endemic to Europe.

== Location ==
The Desert de les Palmes stretches in a NE - SW direction in the municipal terms of Benicàssim, Cabanes, La Pobla Tornesa, Borriol and Castelló de la Plana. It is located near the Mediterranean coastline, crossed by the highway between Barcelona and Valencia.

This mountain range has two ridges covered mostly with Maquis shrubland and low Mediterranean forest. There were two serious forest fires in 1985 and 1992.

Some of the peaks of the Desert de les Palmes are more jagged than the summits of other mountain ranges in the same system, like Serra d'Irta or Talaies d'Alcalà. The castles of Montornés and Miravet date back to Moorish times and the Ermita de les Santes church was built in 1617. There are two ridges in the range, the Desert de les Palmes and the Serra de les Santes, the latter named after the Ermita de les Santes. The mountain range was declared a Nature Reserve by the Generalitat Valenciana in 1989 with the name Parc Natural del Desert de les Palmes.

== Geology ==
The Desert de les Palmes is located in the transition area between the Mediterranean System and the Iberian System that formed 25 million years ago as part of the Alpine orogeny.

Both the Desert de les Palmes and the Serra de les Santes are part of an anticline of paleozoic materials. Slate, as well as red triassic and grey jurassic and cretaceous rocks give the exposed areas of this mountain range striking colors.

== See also ==
- Mountains of the Valencian Community
