= Borriol =

- Municipality and town
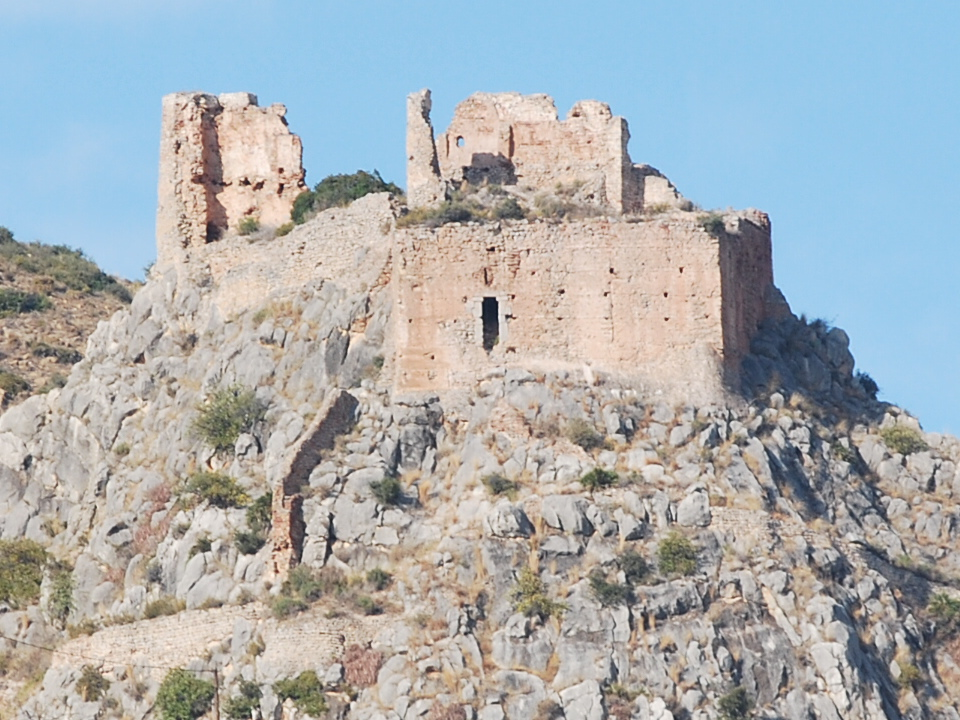
- Borriol Castle

- Flag Coat of arms

- Location of Borriol in the Province of Castellón Location of Borriol in the Valencian Community Location of Borriol in Spain
- Coordinates: 40°2′32″N 0°4′17″W
- Country: Spain
- Autonomous community: Valencian Community
- Province: Castellón
- Comarca: Plana Alta

Area
  - Total: 62.1 km^{2} (24.0 sq mi)
- Elevation: 208 m (682 ft)

Population (2025-01-01)
  - Total: 6,018
  - Density: 96.9/km^{2} (251/sq mi)
- Time zone: UTC+1 (CET)
  - Summer (DST): UTC+2 (CEST)
- Postal code: 12190
- Website: http://www.borriol.es

Borriol is a town and municipality located in the province of Castellón, Valencian Community, Spain.

== History ==
Numerous archaeological remains, including the rock paintings of l'Albaroc indicate that the Borriol area was populated in antiquity. The Via Augusta was used by the Roman military, and the existence of a milestone in the municipality is preserved in the municipal museum.

The remains of a castle stand high on a rock overlooking the town centre. Borriol received a settlement charter, granted by King James I of Aragon, in 1250. The manor passed into various hands, such as the Bishop of Tortosa, and the families of Boïl, Tous and Casalduch. Its population consisted mainly of Muslim families until the expulsion of the Moors in 1609.

== Geography ==
Map of the comarca of Plana Alta

Borriol is situated in a valley between the Desert de les Palmes and the Serra de Borriol mountains, in the southwest of the comarca of Plana Alta. The municipality of Borriol borders the municipalities of Sant Joan de Moró, Vilafamés, La Pobla Tornesa, L'Alcora, Benicàssim and Castellón de la Plana, all belonging to the Province of Castellón. The proximity to the provincial capital of Castellón de la Plana makes Borriol a dynamic town with a growing economy. The local landscape is typical of the Mediterranean, with dry fields with olive and carob trees, next to the mountains of the Paraje Natural del Desierto de las Palmas. Borril is accessed by the CV-151 and CV-10 roads.

There are several streams running through the municipality, including the La Botalaria, La Teula, San Martí or Codina. The flow of the streams is generally low or even dry, due to the variability in rainfall in the area.

== Economy ==
The local economy is based on predominantly rain-fed cultivation of olive and carob trees. The proximity to the capital of the province has seen a development in the auxiliary industry sector. Like neighbouring municipalities in the region, a few families support their income by selling ceramics.

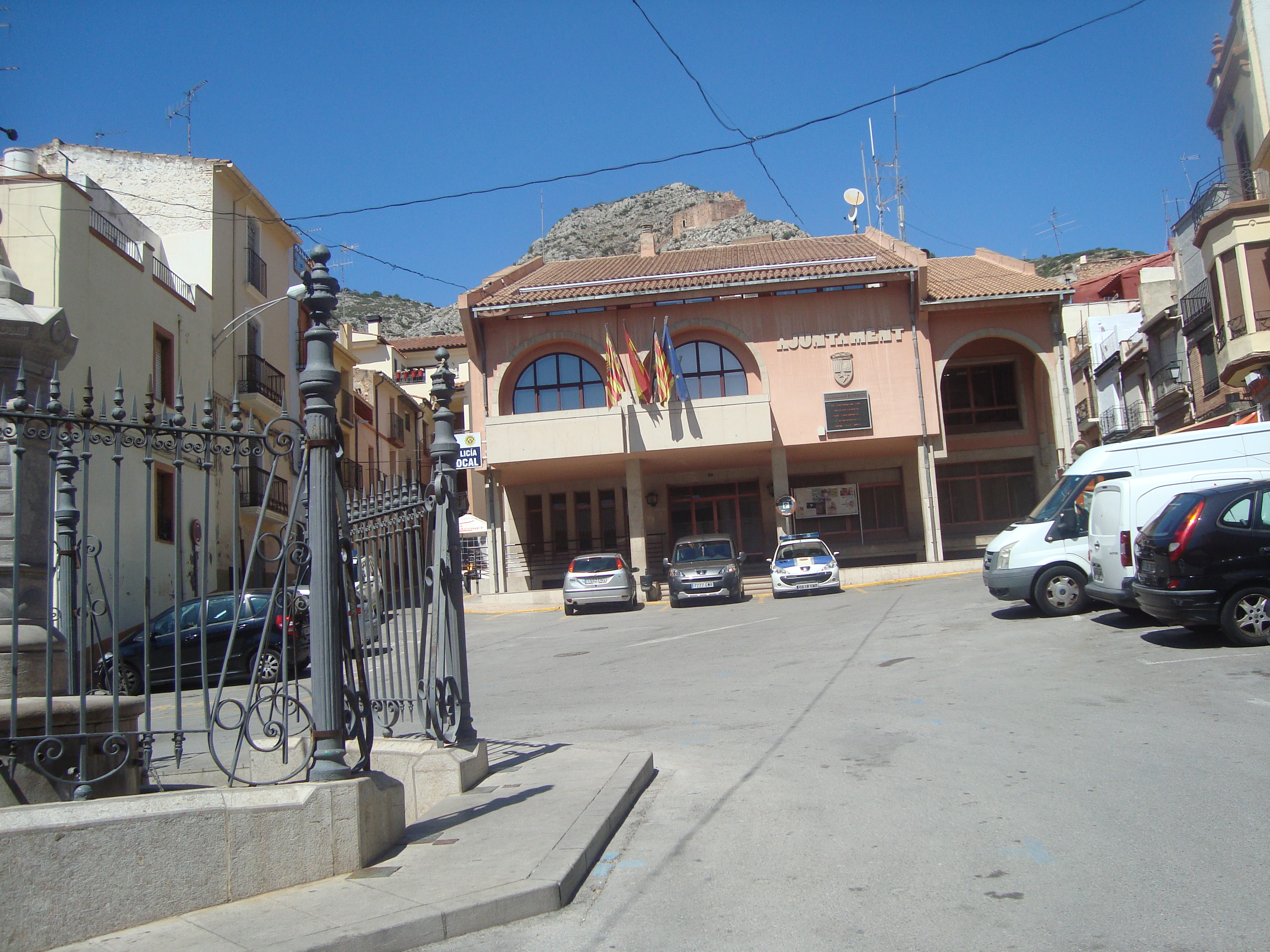
Ayuntamiento de Borriol

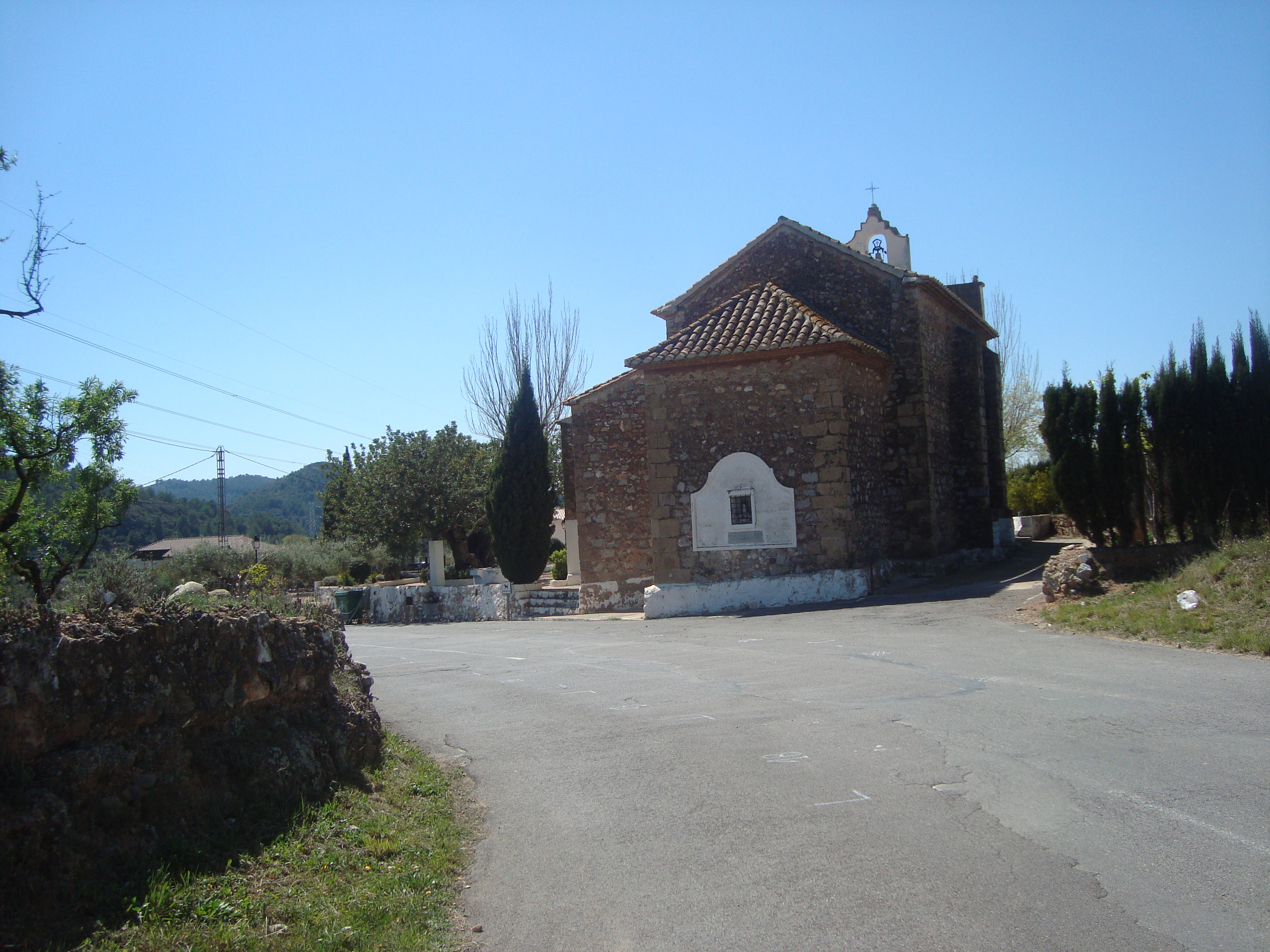
Ermita de San Vicente Ferrer y el camino romano de la Via Augusta (Borriol)

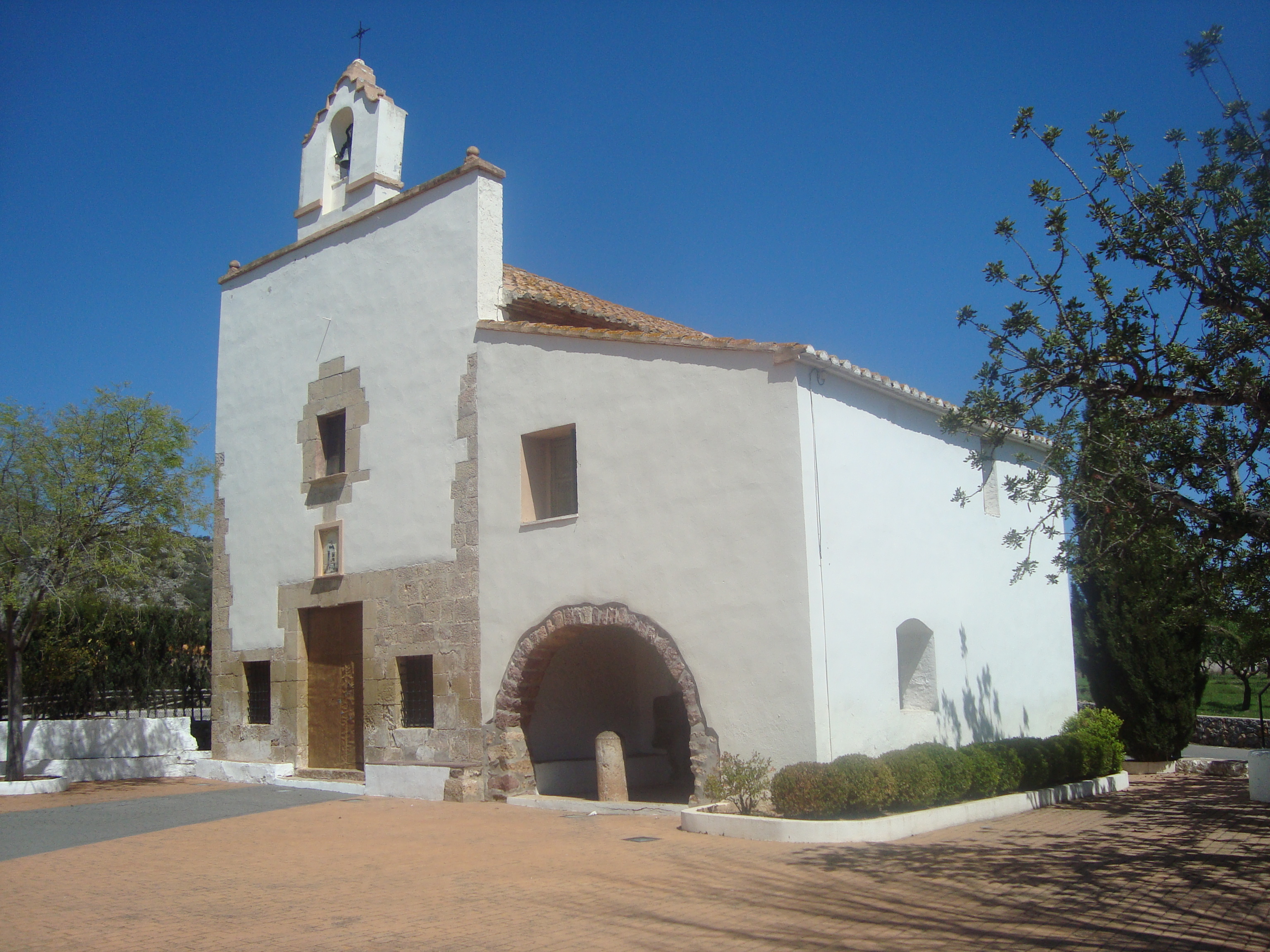
Ermita de San Vicente Ferrer de Borriol (Castellón)

== Notable landmarks ==
The Ermita de San Vicente dates to the seventeenth century. It consists of a nave of three bays. It retains the stone on which the titular saint preached on 14 April 1410. The Iglesia de San Bartolomé contains a nave with 4 bays, and its Gothic vault and fresco decorations allude to the life of St. Bartholomew scenes. The Roman milestone, preserved in the local museum, dates to the third century, during the reign of Emperor Decius. Borriol Castle, overlooking the town, is of Arab origin on Roman foundations, and is currently in ruins. The old walled enclosure has only one door. The turret is of Arabic origin, and the hall dates to the 14th century, in the Gothic style.

== Notable people ==
- Sergio García (born 1980), professional golfer, winner of the 2017 U.S. Masters.
