= Thomas Croft =

Tom or Thomas Croft may refer to:

== Sports ==
- Thomas Croft Buck (born 1970), Danish lightweight rower
- Tom Croft (born 1985), English rugby union player
- Tucker Croft (Thomas Croft, died 1955), Irish footballer

== Others ==
- Thomas Croft (MP) for Ludlow (UK Parliament constituency)
- Tommy Croft, comedian in Jollyboat (comedy act)
- Sir Thomas Elmsley Croft, 7th Baronet (1798–1835), of the Croft baronets
- Sir Thomas Stephen Hutton Croft, 6th Baronet (born 1959), of the Croft baronets
- Thomas Croft (artist) (fl. 2013–), British portrait painter

== See also ==
- Thomas Crofts, British bibliophile, Anglican priest, Fellow of the Royal Society and European traveller
