= David Rowe-Beddoe, Baron Rowe-Beddoe =

Welsh businessman and life peer (1937–2023)

The Right Honourable The Lord Rowe-Beddoe DL
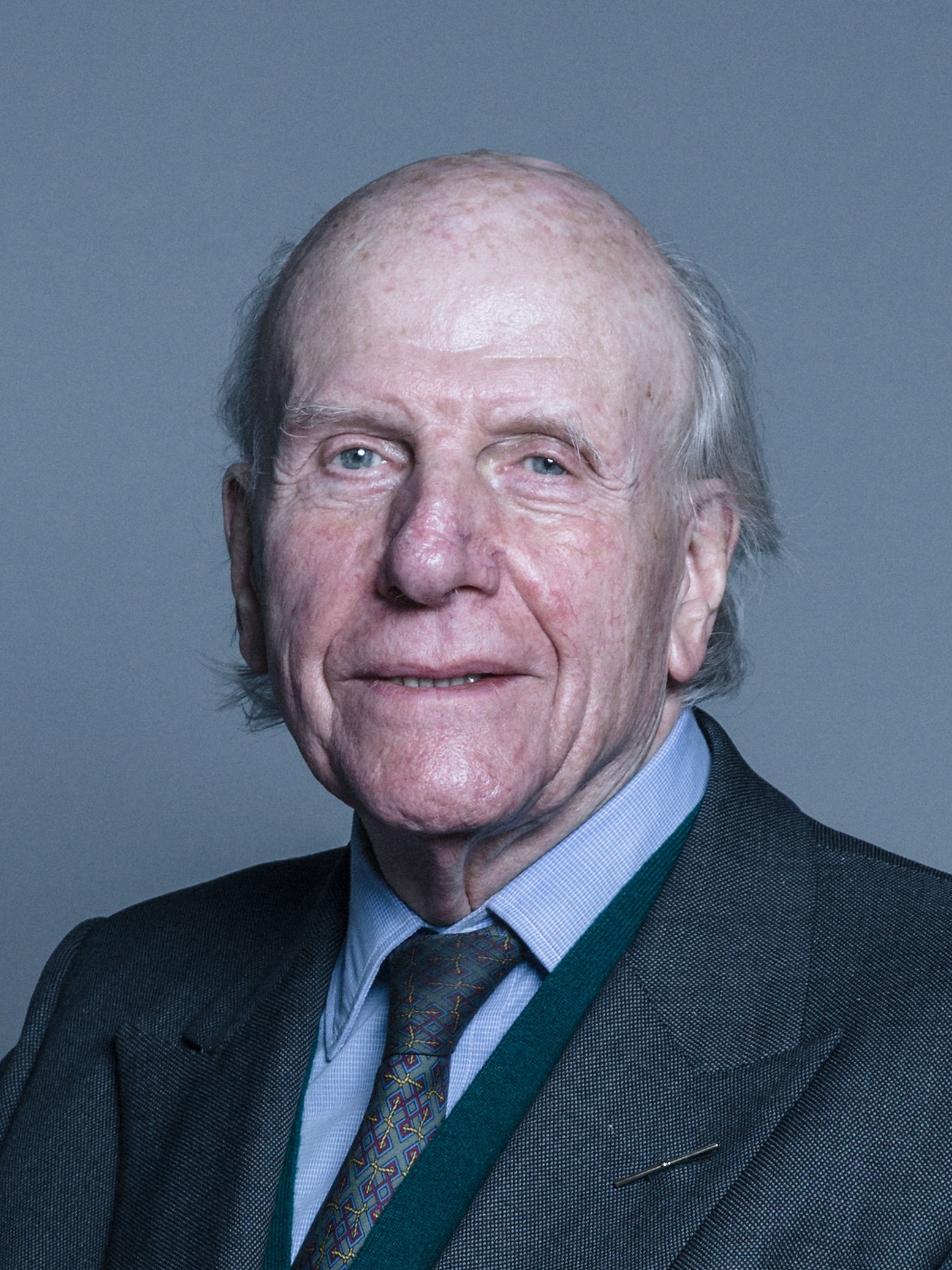
- Official portrait, 2018

Member of the House of Lords
- Lord Temporal
- Life peerage 15 June 2006 – 15 November 2023

Personal details
- Born: David Sydney Rowe-Beddoe; 19 December 1937
- Died: 15 November 2023 (aged 85)
- Party: Crossbench
- Occupation: Businessman

David Sydney Rowe-Beddoe, Baron Rowe-Beddoe, DL (19 December 1937 – 15 November 2023), was a Welsh businessman and life peer who was a crossbench member of the House of Lords. Lord Rowe-Beddoe was chairman of the Welsh Development Agency, and was chairman of Cardiff Airport until November 2016.

== Early life ==
David Sydney Rowe Beddoe was born on 19 December 1937, as the son of Sydney Rowe Beddoe an Engineer and Dolan Evans an Opera singer and tutor at the Royal Welsh College of Music and Drama and the Mozarteum Salzburg.

Rowe-Beddoe's early education was at The Cathedral School, Llandaff, Cardiff, where he won the Victor Ludorum in 1951. He attended, as a music scholar at Stowe School at Buckingham, Buckinghamshire, and St John's College, Cambridge.

In 1964, David Rowe-Beddoe married Malinda Collison, and the union produced three daughters. The couple were divorced in 1982. He remarried in 1984, to Madeleine Harrison.

== Career ==
Rowe-Beddoe's career in business began at Thomas De La Rue in 1961; and he rose to the position of Chief Executive from 1971 through 1976. At Revlon, he was president, Latin America, Europe, Middle East and Africa from 1976 through 1981. He also served as president, Morgan Stanley-GFTA Ltd from 1983 through 1991.

Rowe-Beddoe was known as a Monaco-based businessman and a Tory party fund-raiser when an opportunity arose for him to be appointed to a Welsh quango; and that opportunity led to others. He was appointed chairman of the Welsh Development Agency (WDA) in July 1993; and the term of this appointment was nine years. He was invested as a Knight Bachelor in the 2000 Birthday Honours "for services to Industrial and Economic Development in Wales."

In 2001, Sir David Rowe-Beddoe was appointed the Chairman of the Wales Millennium Centre; and he remained in this post.

In 2004, Sir David Rowe-Beddoe was appointed president of the Royal Welsh College of Music and Drama having previously been a governor and chairman of the board.

In 2005, he received the Beacon Prize for Wales for his contribution to the economic and social development of Wales.

On 15 June 2006, he was created a life peer as Baron Rowe-Beddoe, of Kilgetty in the County of Dyfed.

In April 2007, Lord Rowe-Beddoe was created Pro-Chancellor of the University of Glamorgan.

Lord Rowe-Beddoe was a Deputy Chair of the UK Statistics Authority who held responsibility for the governance of the Office for National Statistics.

An Anglican, Lord Rowe-Beddoe was chairman of the Representative Body of The Church in Wales from 2002 to 2012.

== Death ==
Lord Rowe-Beddoe died on 15 November 2023, at the age of 85.

== Honours ==
- Cardiff University, Honorary fellow, 1999.
- University of Wales, Honorary degree (DScEcon), 2004.
- Order of the Rising Sun, Gold Rays with Neck Ribbon, 2008.
- University of Glamorgan, Honorary Doctor
- University of Aberystwyth, Honorary fellow
- UWIC, Honorary Fellow
- UWCN, Honorary Fellow
- Deputy Lieutenant of Gwent

== RWCMD ==
The David Rowe-Beddoe Shakespeare prize, named in his honour, is an annual competition among BA Acting students at The Royal Welsh College of Music and Drama. First held in 2023, and judged by Sir Ian McKellen, the final takes place at the Royal Court theatre in London and the winner receives £5,000 in prize money.

The first winner was James Mace in 2023, the other finalists were Nathan Kirby, Mya Pennicott, Saskia West and Alyson Handley.

In 2024 Meg Basham was declared the winner alongside her fellow finalists Alice Baxter, Malcolm Bishop, Tumba Katanda and Max Lauder.

And most recently Rachel Doherty won in 2025 judged by Sir Johnathan Pryce. The other finalists consisted of Georgia Booker, Alex Dunne, Daniel Hickey Leonardo Tataei and Lucian Zanes.

== Arms ==
Coat of arms of David Rowe-Beddoe, Baron Rowe-Beddoe
Adopted 2008 Coronet Coronet of a Baron Crest A demi roebuck Gules attired Or and supporting a Welsh triple harp Or. Escutcheon Gules papillonny Or on a pale Argent a pallet Gules. Supporters On either side a Dragon reguardant Gules anciently crowned and gorged with a plain collar attached thereto a chain reflexed over the back Or. Motto Duw A'Ch Cynhalio Badge Two Welsh triple Harps addorsed each front pillar terminating in a roebuck's head Or. Symbolism The grantee was Chairman of the Royal Welsh College of Music and Drama. His connection with music and the theatre is reflected in the Arms where the papillonny suggests theatre seats, the pale and pallet forming a central red-carpeted aisle. The dragons and the Welsh triple harps are an obvious allusion to Wales and music with the roebuck providing a pun on Rowe.
