= Hop Farm Festival =

Music festival in Kent, England

Hop Farm Music Festival
- Genre: Mixed, folk, indie
- Dates: First weekend of July
- Locations: Paddock Wood, Kent
- Years active: 2008–2012, 2014
- Founders: John Vincent Power / UK Events & Production / The Hop Farm
- Website: thehopfarmmusicfestival.com

Hop Farm Music Festival was an annual music festival at The Hop Farm Country Park in Paddock Wood, Kent in England, first created by John Vincent Power of Festival Republic. After its first year it was nominated at the UK Festival Awards with "Best New Festival".

It came about after a survey was conducted among festival fans with the general feeling revealed to be that they always felt the lowest in priority and importance. The survey resulted in the first Hop Farm Festival in 2008, as a 30,000 crowd capacity festival centered on folk and independent music, with a specific aim of a return to "back to basics" organisation with a no sponsorship, no branding, no VIP attitude. Children under twelve, since the festival's inception, have had free entry. In May 2013 it was announced the sixth festival had been cancelled. On 4–6 July 2014 the Hop Farm hosted an all-new Hop Farm Music Festival 2014 which featured headline artists including Brian Wilson, Ray Davies, James Blunt, and Grace Jones.

Later festivals planned by a new organisation no longer related to John Vincent Power did not take place, and the Hop Farm Festival Company entered liquidation in 2014.

== Hop Farm 2008 ==
The first ever Hop Farm Music Festival was just a one-day event on 6 July with only one stage. The day was headlined by Neil Young with Primal Scream, Guillemots, Supergrass, Laura Marling, Rufus Wainwright, My Morning Jacket, and Everest also playing.

== Hop Farm 2009 ==
The 2009 festival was scheduled for 3–5 July, a now 2 day festival with a capacity increased to 53,000 and an extra 2 stages introduced. The main acts over the event period are shown below.

Day/Arena	Main Stage	Dance Tent	Third Stage
Saturday 4 July	The Fratellis; The Pigeon Detectives; The View; Ash; Florence and the Machine; Noah and the Whale	Etienne De Crecy; D.I.M; Jape	Bell X1; The Twilight Sad; Lets Wrestle
Sunday 5 July	Paul Weller; Editors; Doves	2manydjs; Scratch Perverts; One Suit Trainer	British Sea Power; 65daysofstatic; Fight Like Apes

2009 marked the first year of a celebrity football tournament at the festival participated by, among many others, some former Big Brother contestants.

== Hop Farm 2010 ==
The 2010 festival was held on the weekend of 2–3 July over 3 stages and proved to a controversial year. Before the festival had even started people complained of misleading ticket sales. Originally marketed as once again, a one-day festival, tickets went on sale for a second date much later, one month to the event, to the surprise and annoyance of many who had already bought a ticket. The organisation of the festival has been subject to much criticism, this included the long queues, poor sound system and a water pressure malfunction. It was during the late afternoon of Saturday, that the only water pump supplying the camp of 20,000 with water suffered a pressure malfunction and subsequently left the camp bereft of a water supply.

The main line-up for 2010 was as follows:

Day/Arena	Main Stage	Big Tent	Bread and Roses Stage	Comedy Stage
Friday 2 July	Van Morrison; Blondie; Dr. John; Los Lobos	Afro Celt Sound System; Richard Thompson; Stornoway	Al Medley Collective; Eight Legs; Hoodlums	Suzy Bennet; Carly Smallman; Keith Platt; Christian Reilly
Saturday 3 July	Bob Dylan; Ray Davies; Mumford and Sons; Seasick Steve	Devandra Banhart; Hypnotic Brass Ensemble; Tunng	East Park Reggae Collective; Empress; Billy Vincent	Bob Mills; Lee Nelson; Ian Cognito

Others who performed through the event included Pete Doherty, The Magic Numbers, Imelda May, Damien Dempsey, Laura Marling, Foy Vance, Johnny Flynn and many others.

The year also saw the introduction of a camp stage within the campsite, free for those who had bought weekend camping tickets, but only one day entrance ticket to the arena. Marcus Bonfanti and Robinson were among those who performed.

The years celebrity football tournament participants included the return of the former Big Brother contestants along with the cast of Waterloo Road, Mumford and Sons and Johnny Flynn among others.

== Hop Farm 2011 ==
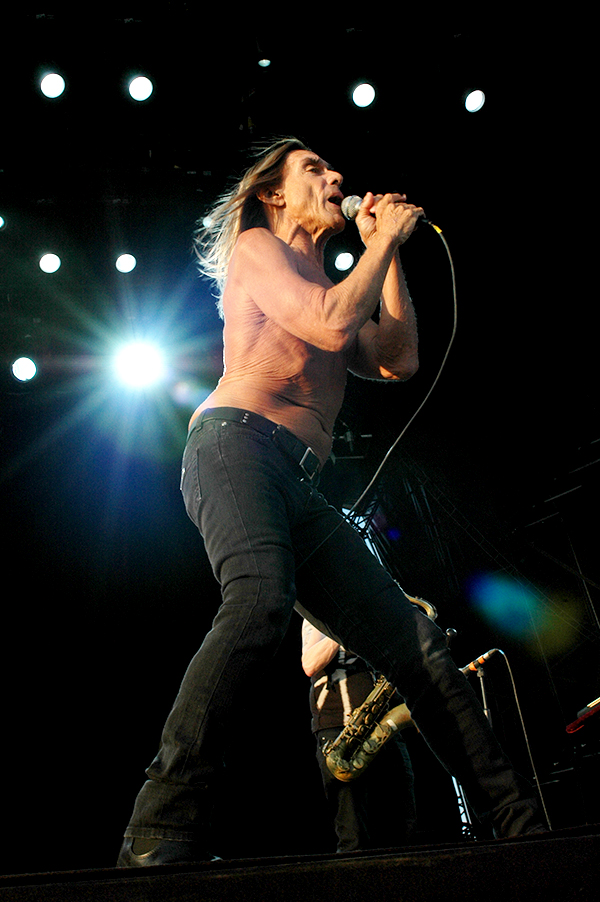
Iggy Pop performing in 2011

The 2011 event returned during its normal two-day slot in the first weekend of July. 6 weeks prior to the opening date of the festival, organisers announced an extra date to the festival to be headlined by Prince. The addition of an extra date 3 months after the initial tickets were put on sale created much anger towards the festival for misleading ticket buyers yet again, after a similar incident the previous year.

Day/Arena	Main Stage	Big Tent	Bread and Roses Stage	Comedy Stage
Friday 1 July	Eagles; Bryan Ferry; Brandon Flowers; 10cc	The Human League; Ocean Colour Scene; The Walkmen	Stornoway; Erland and the Carnival; Treetop Flyers	Isy Suttie; Elis James; Simon Munnery
Saturday 2 July	Morrissey; Lou Reed; Iggy and The Stooges; Patti Smith	Manu Chao La Ventura; Noisettes; Gang of Four	Guillemots; The Leisure Society; Carl Barat	Sean Hughes; Stewart Lee; Terry Alderton; Carl Donnelly; Abandoman
Sunday 3 July	Prince; Tinie Tempah; Larry Graham	Hot Chip; The Pierces	Young Knives; Fenech Soler; Young Rebel Set	

2011 saw the return of the well received Camp Acoustic stage. Brother and Bones, Tankus the Henge, Never the Bride and Nathan Mercado, among others, all performed during the weekend.

== Hop Farm 2012 ==
Hop Farm Festival returned in 2012 during its usual date of the first weekend of July. Despite much time taken by the organisers to release the line up, which indeed led to speculation that it had actually been cancelled, the line up was released in March. The main line up can be seen below.

Day/Arena	Main Stage	Big Tent	Bread and Roses Stage
Friday 29 June	Peter Gabriel; Ray Davies; George Clinton; Dr John	Nitin Sawhney; The Stranglers; The Futureheads	British Sea Power; I Am Kloot; Field Music
Saturday 30 June	Bob Dylan; Damien Rice; Patti Smith; Bruce Forsyth	Primal Scream; Maxïmo Park; Gary Numan	Peter Hook; White Denim; Ben Kweller
Sunday 1 July	Suede; Richard Ashcroft; The Psychedelic Furs; Kool and the Gang	My Morning Jacket; Gilbert O'Sullivan; Ian Hunter	Frightened Rabbit; Tom Vek; Gruff Rhys

2012 saw the return of the comedy stage where comedians such as Russell Kane, Stephen K Amos, Patrick Monahan, Ant Dewson and Jollyboat performed. As well as the welcomed return of the comedy stage was the Camp Acoustic where Jamie Abbott, Ilona and Marcus Bonfanti (amongst others) performed. Younger soloists like Mary Epworth also made their first appearance in 2012. In addition to this was the introduction of two new locations for musicians to perform. Located adjacent the bars was the new Power's Bar Stage which played host to many independent artists over the three days, and there was also the new Busker's Boulevard, in which artists performed all along the main path between the campsite and the arena, to accompany the attendees and make the long walk shorter.
