= Bartolo (peak) =

Mountain in Spain

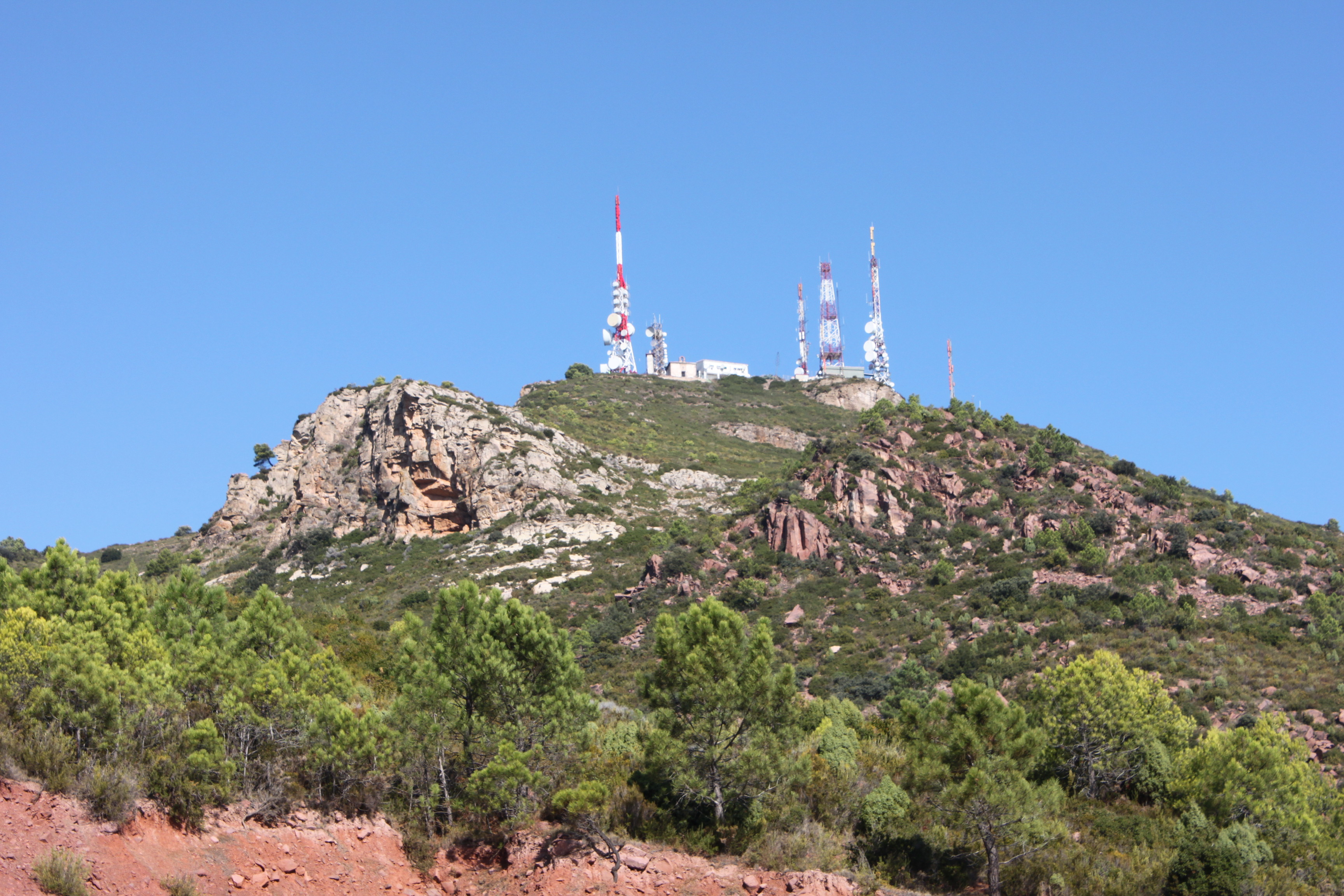

Highest point
- Elevation: 729 m (2,392 ft)
- Listing: List of mountains in the Valencian Community
- Coordinates: 40°05′08″N 0°01′52″E

Geography
- Location within Spain
- Location: Plana Alta (Valencian Community)
- Parent range: Desert de les Palmes, Mediterranean System

Climbing
- First ascent: Unknown
- Easiest route: From Benicàssim

Bartolo or Pic de Bartolo is the highest peak of the Desert de les Palmes range, Valencian Community, Spain. It reaches an elevation of 729 metres (2,392 ft) above sea level. There are antennas at the top.

Bartolo is located within the Benicàssim municipal term, rising about 3 km to the north of the town. The summit offers a good view of the Mediterranean coast as well as of the nearby mountains of the range.

== See also ==
- Mountains of the Valencian Community
