= 2006 Special Honours =

British government recognitions

As part of the British honours system, the Special Honours are issued at the King's pleasure at any given time. The Special Honours confer the award of the Order of the Garter, Order of the Thistle, Order of Merit, Royal Victorian Order and the Order of St John. Life Peers are at times also awarded as special honours.

== Life peers ==
Life peers are appointed members of the peerage whose titles cannot be inherited, in contrast to hereditary peers.

=== Baronesses ===
- Margaret Anne Ford, chairman, English Partnerships.
- Margaret Jones, Director of Policy and Public Affairs, UNISON.
- Denise Patricia Byrne Kingsmill, CBE, deputy chair, Design Museum.
- Molly Meacher, Chair of the Clinical Ethics Committee for The Central and North West London NHS Trust.
- Eileen Emily Paisley, vice-president, Democratic Unionist Party.
- The Right Honourable Joyce Gwendolen Quin, former Member of Parliament for Gateshead East and Washington West; former Minister of State; Home Office, Foreign and Commonwealth Office and Ministry of Agriculture, Fisheries and Food.
- Celia Marjorie Thomas, MBE, former Head of Office, Office of the Liberal Democrat Whips, House of Lords.
- Sandip Verma, Founder, Domiciliary Care Services UK Ltd.

=== Barons ===
- Karan Bilimoria, CBE, Chancellor of Thames Valley University.
- The Right Honourable Colin David Boyd, Lord Advocate, Scottish Executive.
- The Right Honourable Keith John Charles Bradley, former Member of Parliament for Manchester, Withington; former Minister of State, Home Office.
- Wallace Hamilton Browne, Lord Mayor of Belfast.
- John Patrick Aubone Burnett, former Member of Parliament for Torridge and West Devon.
- Brian Joseph Michael Cotter, former Member of Parliament for Weston-Super-Mare.
- Sir Geoffrey Dear, QPM, former Chief Constable of West Midlands Police.
- Richard Harries, lately Bishop of Oxford.
- David Noel James, CBE, chairman, Litigation Control Group Ltd.
- Charles Guy Rodney Leach, Director, Jardine Matheson Holdings Ltd.
- John Robert Louis Lee, DL, Non-Executive Director, Emerson Developments (Holding) Ltd and James R. Knowles plc, and former Member of Parliament.
- Sir Alexander John (Sandy) Bruce-Lockhart, OBE, Leader, Kent County Council and chairman, Local Government Association.
- Jonathan Peter Marland, former director, Jardine Lloyd Thompson plc.
- Sir William Manuel (Bill) Morris, former General Secretary, Transport and General Workers Union.
- Councillor Maurice George Morrow, MLA, chairman, Democratic Unionist Party.
- Sir David Rowe-Beddoe, Chairman of the Wales Millennium Centre.
- Mohamed Iltaf Sheikh, Chairman of the Conservative Muslim Forum.
- John Derek Taylor, CBE, Director of Taylors Bulbs of Spalding.
- Robin Teverson, Director of Finance South West, and former Member of the European Parliament.
- The Right Honourable William David Trimble, former Member of Parliament for Upper Bann; former Leader, Ulster Unionist Party.

== Royal Victorian Order ==
=== Knight Commander of the Royal Victorian Order (KCVO) ===
- Alan Stanley Collins, CMG.
- The Very Reverend Dr John Henry Moses. On his retirement as Dean of St Paul’s Cathedral.

=== Commander of the Royal Victorian Order (CVO) ===
- Professor Marie Roslyn Bashir, AC.
- John Michael Landy, AC, MBE.
- Frank Leverett.

=== Lieutenant of the Royal Victorian Order (LVO) ===
- Philip Malone, MVO.

=== Member of the Royal Victorian Order (MVO) ===
- Megan Amanda Bonny
- Lieutenant Colonel Mark James Holmes, Australian Army.
- Carole Johnson

== Royal Victorian Medal (RVM) ==
=== Royal Victorian Medal (Silver) ===
- Colin Shearwood.

== Most Excellent Order of the British Empire ==
Ribbon bar of the Order of the British Empire (Civil)

=== Commander of the Order of the British Empire (CBE) ===
Honorary

- Vince Power.
