= Jollyboat (comedy act) =

British musical comedy double act

- Origin: England
- Genres: Cabaret, comedy, folk
- Years active: 2010–present
- Members: Edward Croft, Thomas Croft
- Website: jollyboat.co.uk

Jollyboat is a British musical comedy double act. Formed in Liverpool in 2010, and now based in London, the act comprises siblings Ed and Tommy Croft. They are known for their Pirate Pop Songs and Keyboard Love Song. In 2011, Jollyboat won the Musical Comedy Awards. They have performed shows at the Edinburgh Fringe Festival every year from 2010 to 2021 to positive reviews, including 5-star reviews in 2011, 2012 and 2014, and a recommendation from The Independent.

== Formation ==
Before forming Jollyboat, the siblings Ed Croft and Tommy Croft began performing in 2007 in their home town of Todmorden and at their local open mic in the neighboring town of Hebden Bridge, winning local awards for their novelty songs and performance storytelling.

They later began working together as a cabaret and sketch act, the Amazing Tom and Ed Brothers, and regularly hosted fundraising shows for Amnesty International.

Ed left home to attend the Liverpool Institute for Performing Arts, where he received songwriting tuition from Paul McCartney. Jollyboat was created to be performed at Ed's graduation show from LIPA in 2010, where the brothers played comic songs inspired by shared childhood experiences. This early set included their act, the Pirate Pop Songs, which were inspired by the comic computer game The Secret of Monkey Island.

The name Jollyboat was chosen because it refers both to pirates and comedy. A ‘jolly boat’ is a small rowing boat.

== Career ==
In August 2010, Jollyboat performed their debut Edinburgh Fringe Festival show, to a consistently full house on 20 dates. In the final show, the audience filled the aisles, standing and sitting in every available space.

In 2011, Jollyboat won the Musical Comedy Awards, receiving praise from celebrity comedians Neil Morrissey and Mitch Benn. Tommy commented that this victory had taken them "from the back room of pubs to the West End in less than a year".

The duo also won several Liverpool comedy competitions, including Laughterhouse New Act of the Year, the Best of Rawhide Raw and the Hot Water New Act of the Year.

Jollyboat's 2011 Edinburgh Fringe show received 5 star reviews, and was recommended by The Independent as one of the best acts of the Free Fringe. The pair performed over 60 shows during that month.

In 2012, Jollyboat headlined the comedy tent at Festival Internacional de Benicàssim festival in Spain, as well as the British Hop Farm Festival and Kendal Calling Festival. They were a runner-up in the Golden Jester Awards. Their Edinburgh Fringe show received a second 5-star review, from fringe newspaper Three Weeks. They also played at respected Fringe shows the Chortle Fast Fringe and PBH and Some Comedians.

2013 saw Jollyboat on the lineup of Glastonbury, on the Bread and Roses stage, and at T in the Park in the Cabaret Tent. In 2014 they played Download Festival in the comedy tent.

The brothers are very close, having stated that they "live together, work together and share the same imaginary friend".

== Critical reception ==
Jollyboat has received praise since their first shows at the Edinburgh Fringe in 2010, including 5 star reviews from ThreeWeeks and InformedEdinburgh. Their show has been described as "funny, skilled musical comedy" (InformedEdinburgh), "great comic material and winning performances" (FringeGuru), including "tightly written lyrics, a variety of musical styles to keep the show fresh, and a likeable and enthusiastic on-stage presence" (British Comedy Guide).

Critics have commented on the brother's enthusiastic presentation, including a "likeable onstage presence", a "tangible passion for entertainment" and their "almost psychic connection on stage", which is often attributed to their close relationship.

Fringe Review placed Jollyboat in their Top 5 Comedy shows of 2011.

=== Awards ===
- Musical Comedy Awards 2011, Winner
- Hot Water Comedian of the Year 2011, Winner
- Rawhide Raw New Act of the Year 2011, Winner
- Laughterhouse New Act of the Year 2011, Winner
- Golden Jester Awards 2012, Runner-up (2nd Place)

== Television and radio ==
Jollyboat appeared on Radio 4 Extra alongside David Sedaris and Richard Herring, on Fred MacAulay's BBC Radio Scotland show. Jollyboat have also appeared on BBC Radio Merseyside and Juice FM.
