= Benicàssim =

Benicàssim Benicasim
- Town and municipality
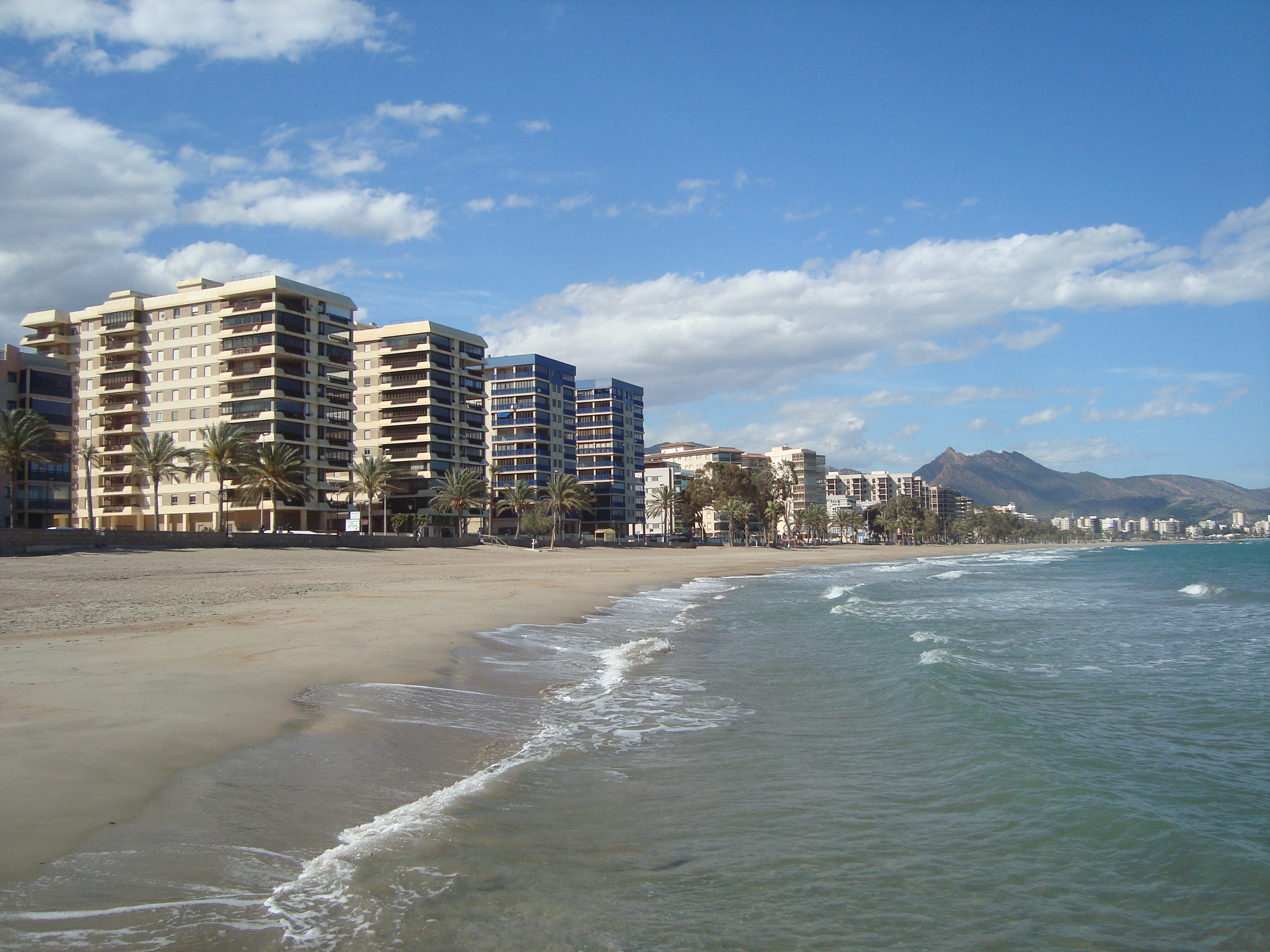
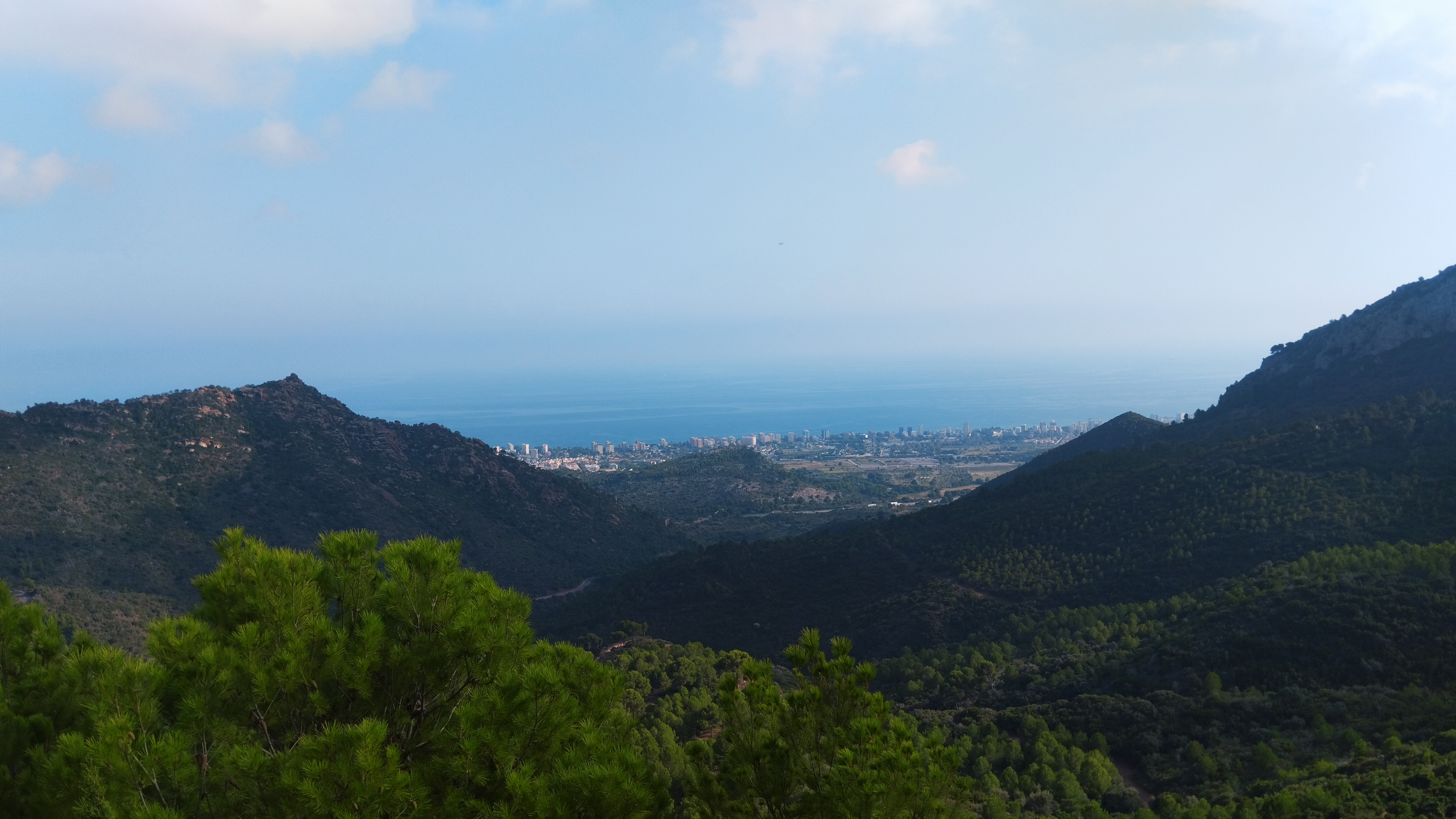
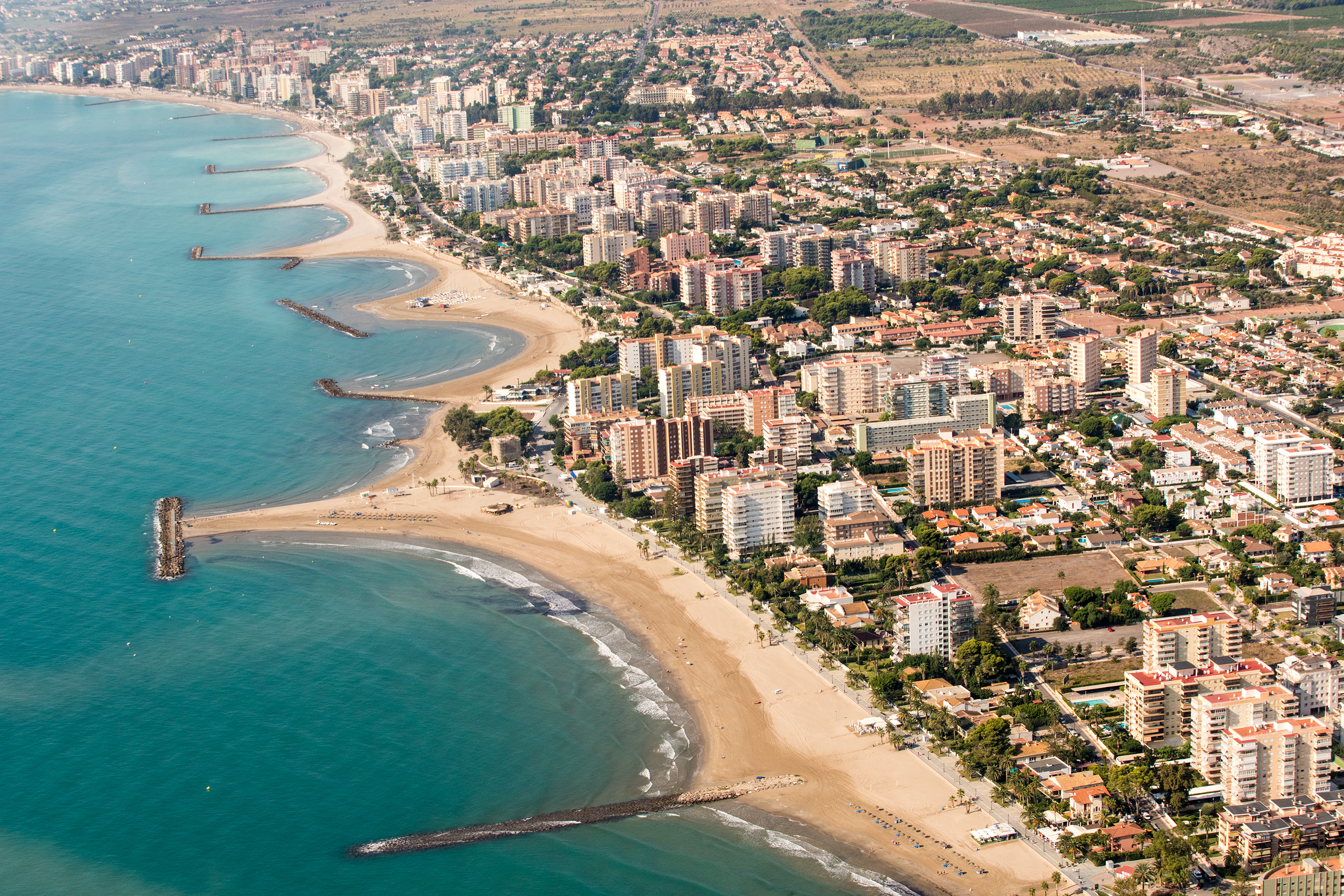
- From top to bottom, from left to right: Heliópolis Beach; Benicàssim viewed from the Desert de les Palmes; Aerial view of the municipality

- Flag Coat of arms
- Interactive map of Benicàssim
- Location within Province of Castellón Location within Valencian Community Location within Spain
- Coordinates: 40°03′19″N 0°03′51″E
- Country: Spain
- Autonomous community: Valencian Community
- Province: Castellón
- Comarca: Plana Alta
- Judicial district: Castellón de la Plana

Government
  - Alcaldessa (Mayoress): Susana Marqués (2015) (PP)

Area
  - Total: 36.1 km^{2} (13.9 sq mi)
- Elevation: 15 m (49 ft)

Population (2025-01-01)
  - Total: 20,539
  - Density: 569/km^{2} (1,470/sq mi)
- Demonyms: benicassut, -da (Val.) benicense (Sp.)
- Official language(s): Valencian; Spanish
- Linguistic area: Valencian
- Time zone: UTC+1 (CET)
  - Summer (DST): UTC+2 (CEST)
- Postal code: 12560
- Dialing code: +34 964
- Website: Official website

Benicàssim, (Note: Pronunciation of Benicàssim: Valencian: [beniˈkasim]) in Valencian (known in Spanish as Benicasim), (Note: Pronunciation of Benicasim (unofficial): Spanish: [benikaˈsin]) is a municipality and beach resort located in the province of Castellón, on the Costa del Azahar in Spain. The Desert de les Palmes mountain range further inland shelters the town from the north wind.

Benicàssim is located 13 km north of the town of Castellón de la Plana, at the north end of the Valencian Community. The town has a population of 18,991 (2021). Its economy is largely based on tourism; the town is well known for its beaches and its music festivals such as Festival Internacional de Benicàssim (FIB) and the Rototom Sunsplash.

== Placename ==
The placename has an Arabic origin, consisting of a compound name using the characteristic Arabic base feature beni ('sons of' > beni-Qasim). The name is derived from the Banu Qasim tribe, a segment of the Kutama Berbers that settled the area during the 8th century Arab conquest of Spain.

== Geography ==
=== Beaches ===
Benicàssim has 6 kilometers of sandy beaches linked by a promenade. The five beaches in this stretch of coast are named

- Almadrava Beach (Platja de l'Almadrava)
- Heliopolis Beach (Platja Heliòpolis)
- Els Terrers Beach (Platja dels Terrers)
- Tower of Saint Vincent Beach (Platja de la Torre de Sant Vicent)
- Voramar Beach (Platja de Voramar): This beach is famous for its villas along a beach front promenade.

=== Desert of the Palms ===
Just inland from Benicàssim lies the Desert of the Palms (Valencian: Desert de les Palmes; Spanish: Desierto de las Palmas). The area is not a literal desert, but a protected natural area and a small mountain range with a maximum elevation of 729 meters (at the peak of Mount Bartolo). The Columbretes Islands are visible from the top of the range on clear days.

== Festivals ==
The town has hosted the prestigious Francisco Tárrega International Guitar Competition (Certamen Internacional de Guitarra Francisco Tárrega) since 1967, in honour of Spanish composer and guitarist Francisco Tárrega (1852–1909).

Others include Festival Internacional de Benicàssim (FIB), Rototom Sunsplash and MABE Benicàssim Art Show.

== Green Way ==
The Via Verda or Vía Verde (Green Way) is a 5.5 km long cycle and walking path along the rugged coast between the resort towns of Benicàssim and Oropesa del Mar (Orpesa).

== Gallery ==
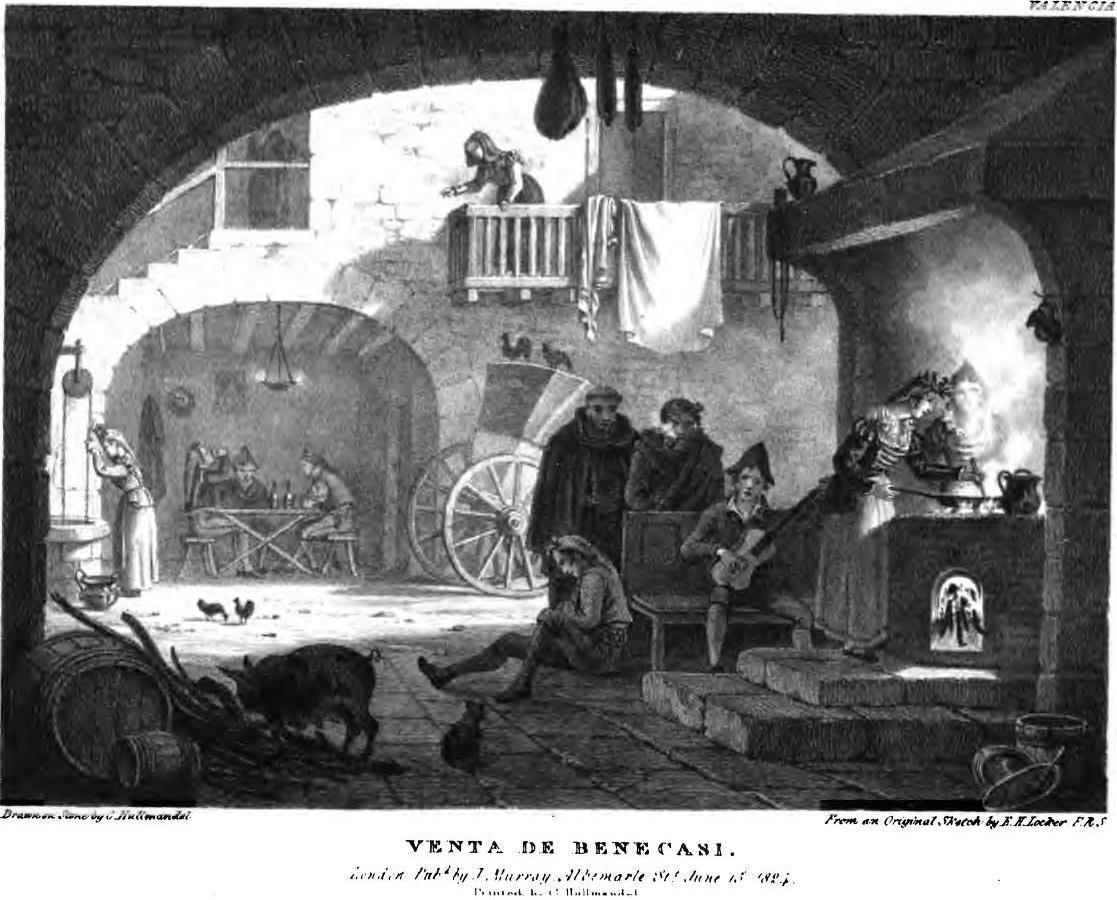
Sale in Benicassim circa 1824 by Edward Hawke Locker

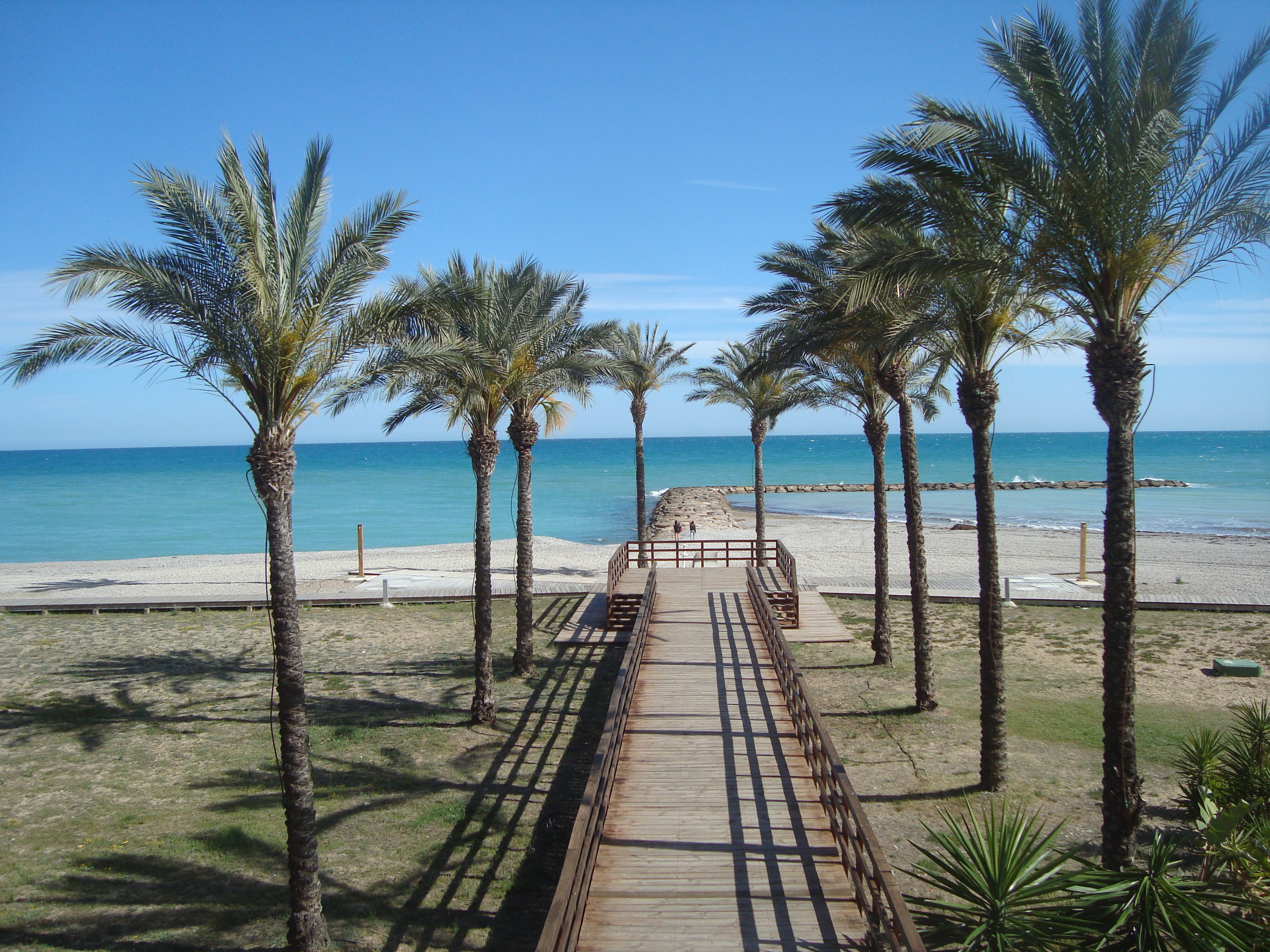
Terrers Beach

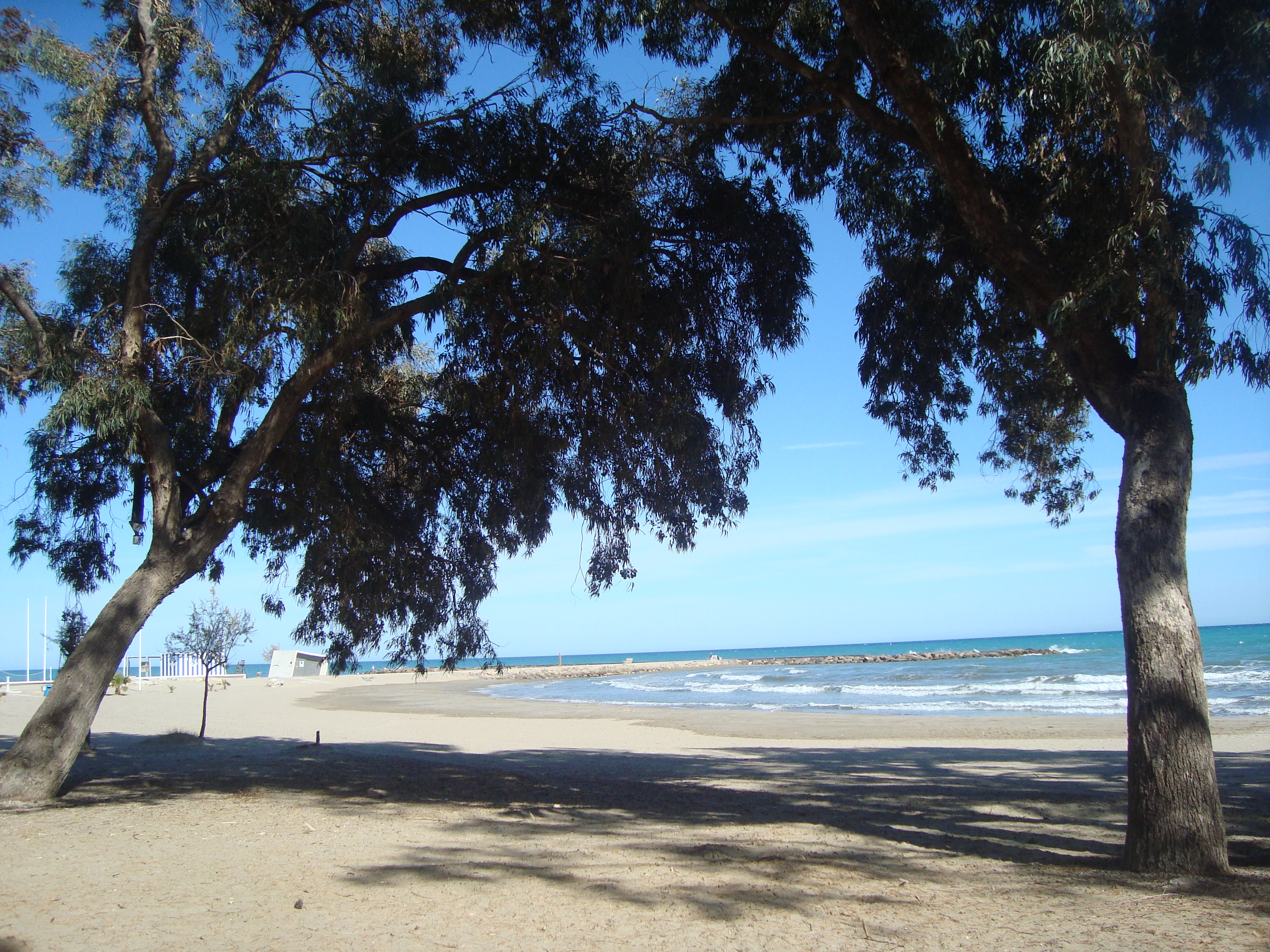
Torre San Vicente / Sant Vicent Beach

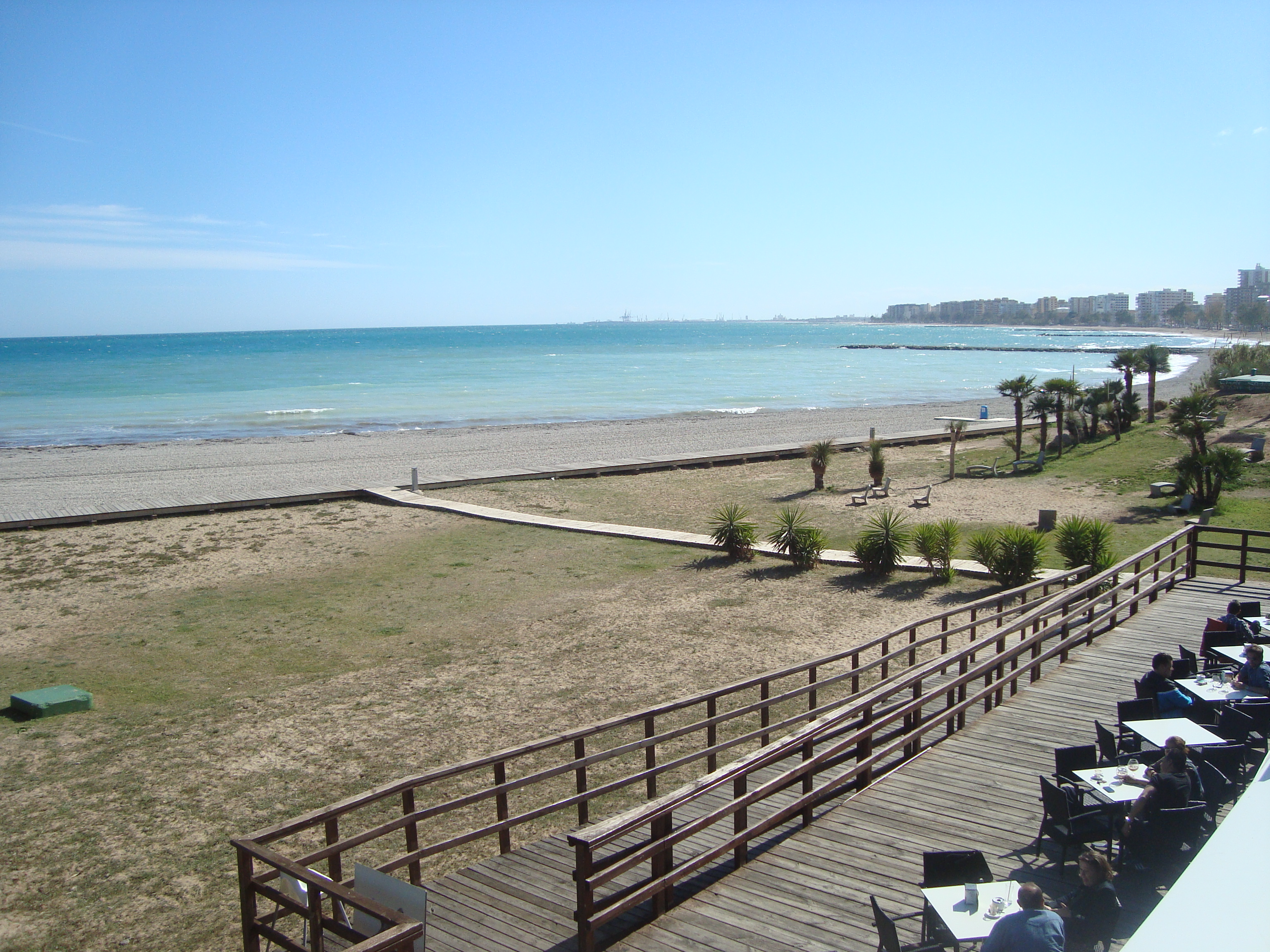
Terrers Beach

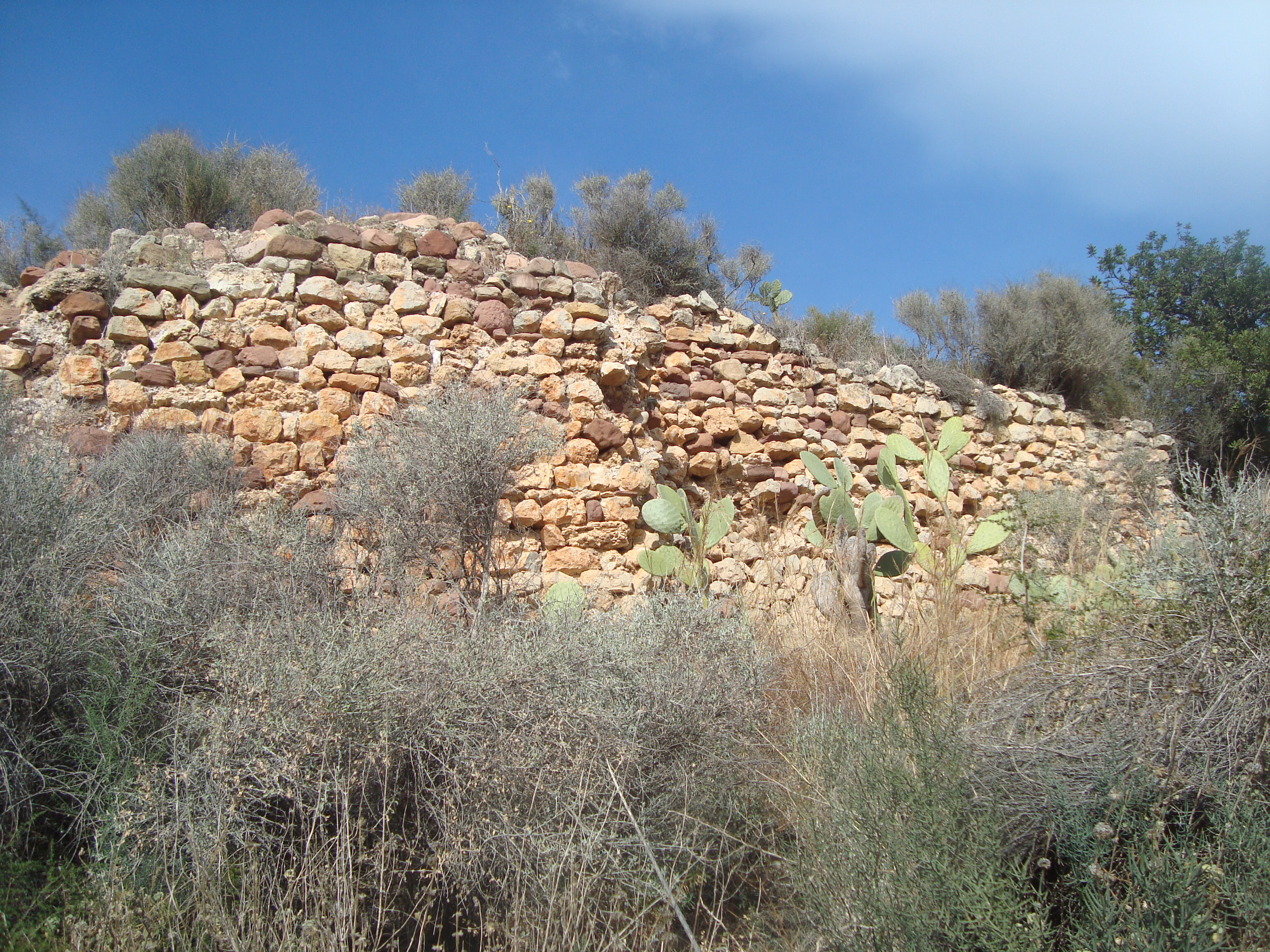
Ruins of the medieval castle

== See also ==
- List of municipalities in Castellón
