= La Pobla Tornesa =

- Municipality and town
- Coat of arms
- Interactive map of La Pobla Tornesa
- Coordinates: 40°06′04″N 0°0′5″W
- Country: Spain
- Autonomous community: Valencian Community
- Province: Castellón
- Comarca: Plana Alta

Area
  - Total: 25.8 km^{2} (10.0 sq mi)
- Elevation: 298 m (978 ft)

Population (2025-01-01)
  - Total: 1,322
  - Density: 51.2/km^{2} (133/sq mi)
- Time zone: UTC+1 (CET)
  - Summer (DST): UTC+2 (CEST)
- Postal code: 12191
- Website: http://www.lapoblatornesa.es

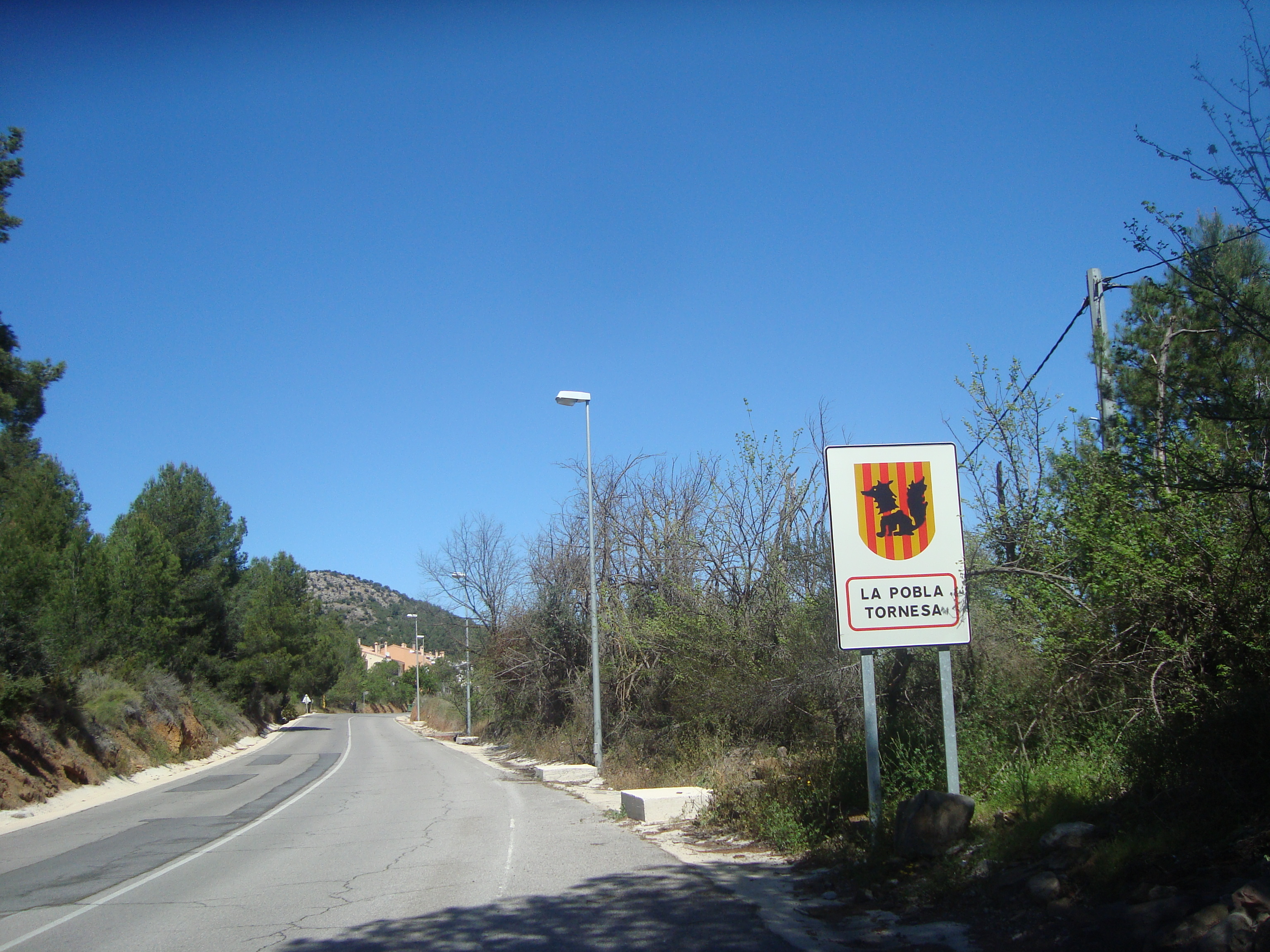
La Pobla Tornesa

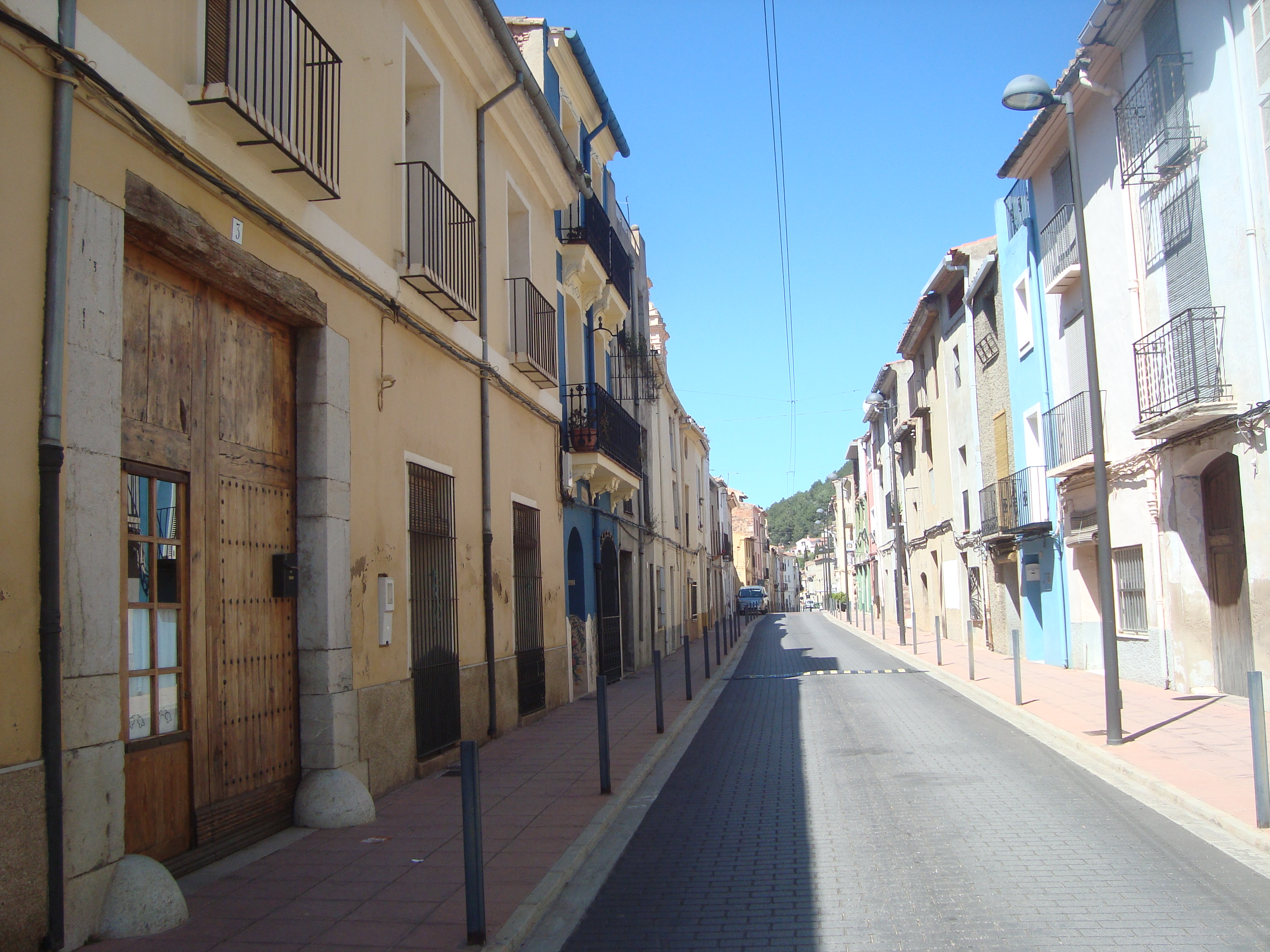
Carrer d'Emmig (La Pobla Tornesa)

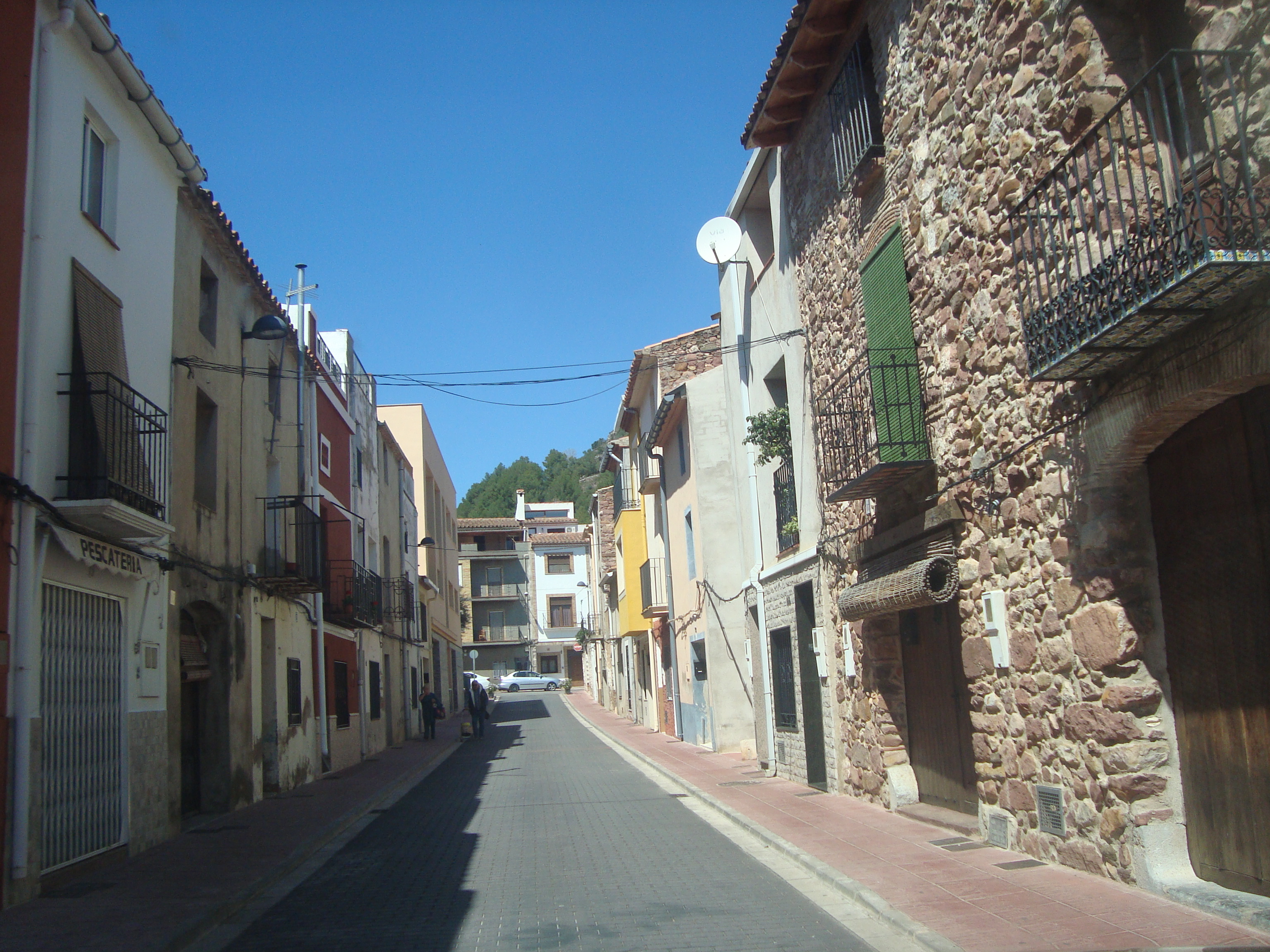
Carrer de Baix la Vila (La Pobla Tornesa)

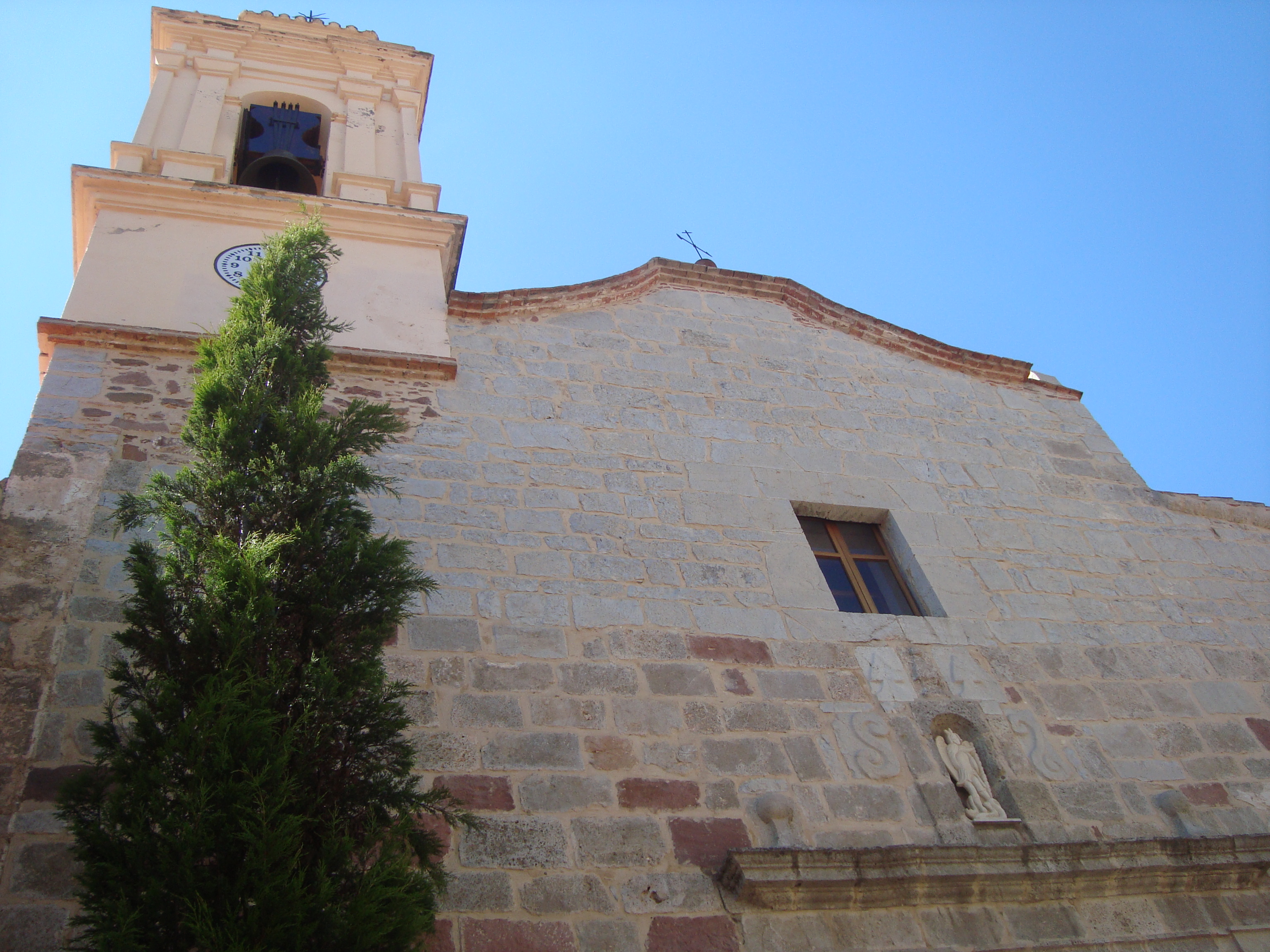
Església parroquial de Sant Miquel Arcàngel (La Pobla Tornesa)

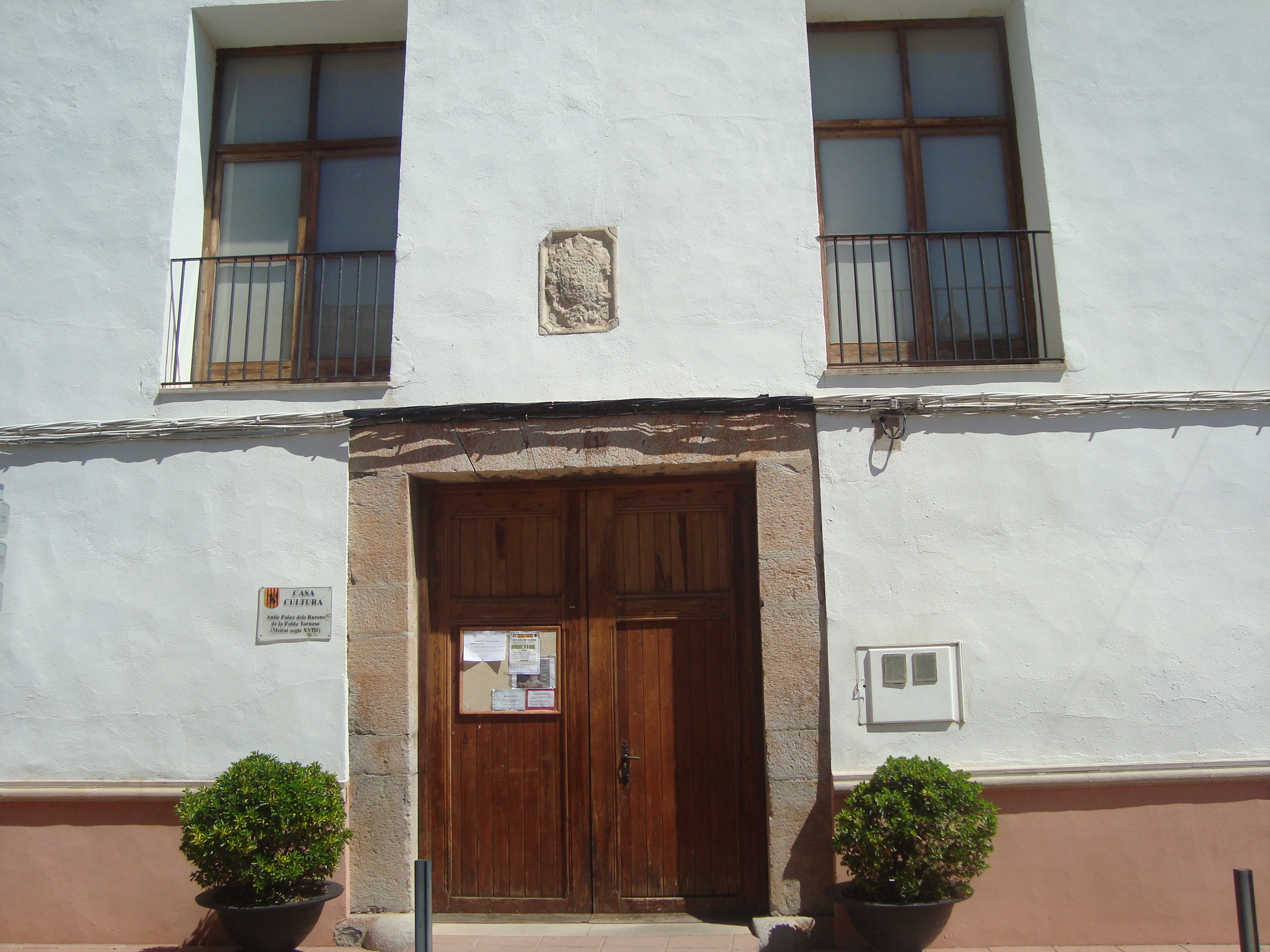
Casa de la Cultura de la Pobla Tornesa, antic Palau dels Barons de la Pobla

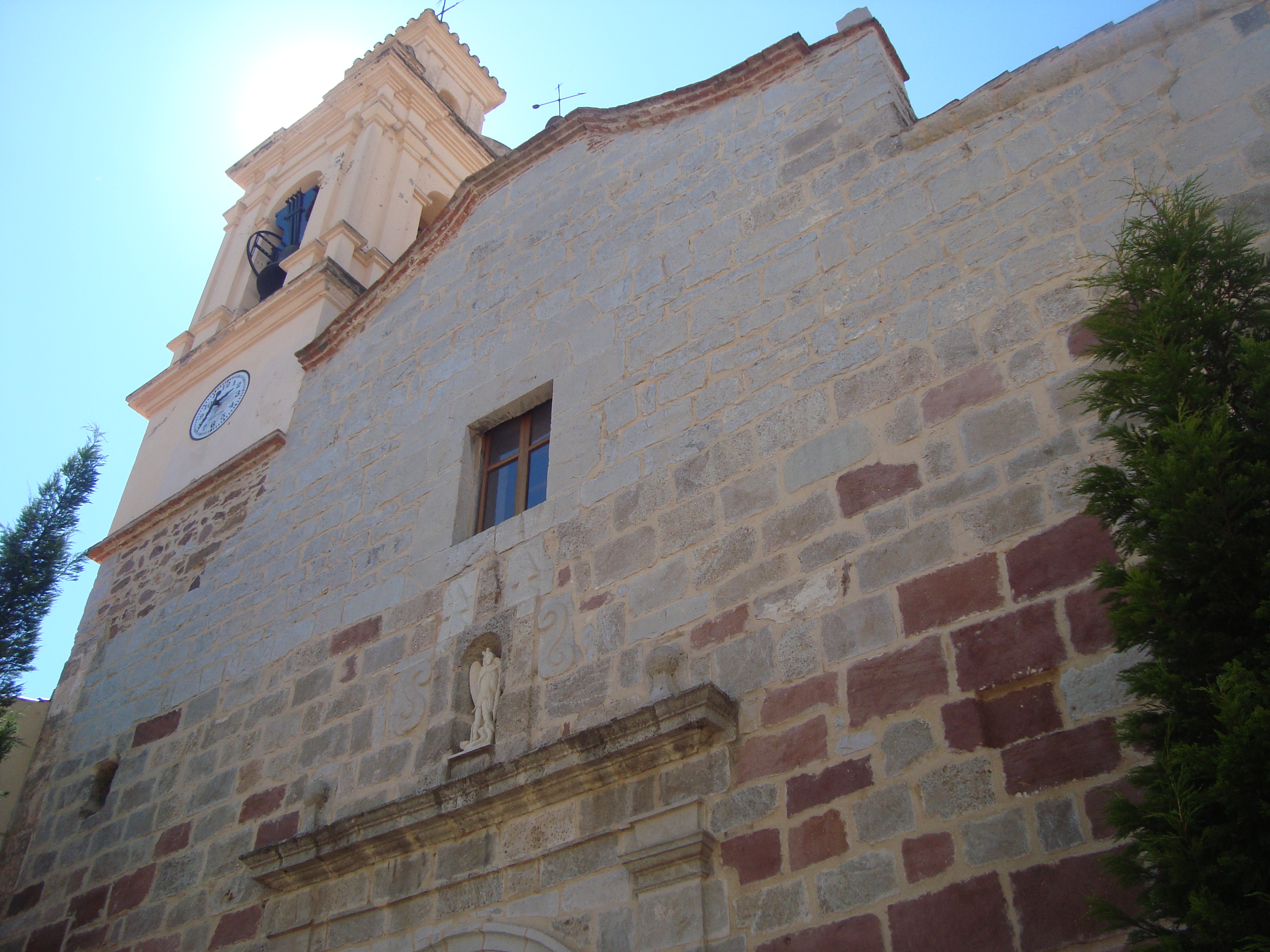
Església parroquial de Sant Miquel Arcàngel (Pobla Tornesa)

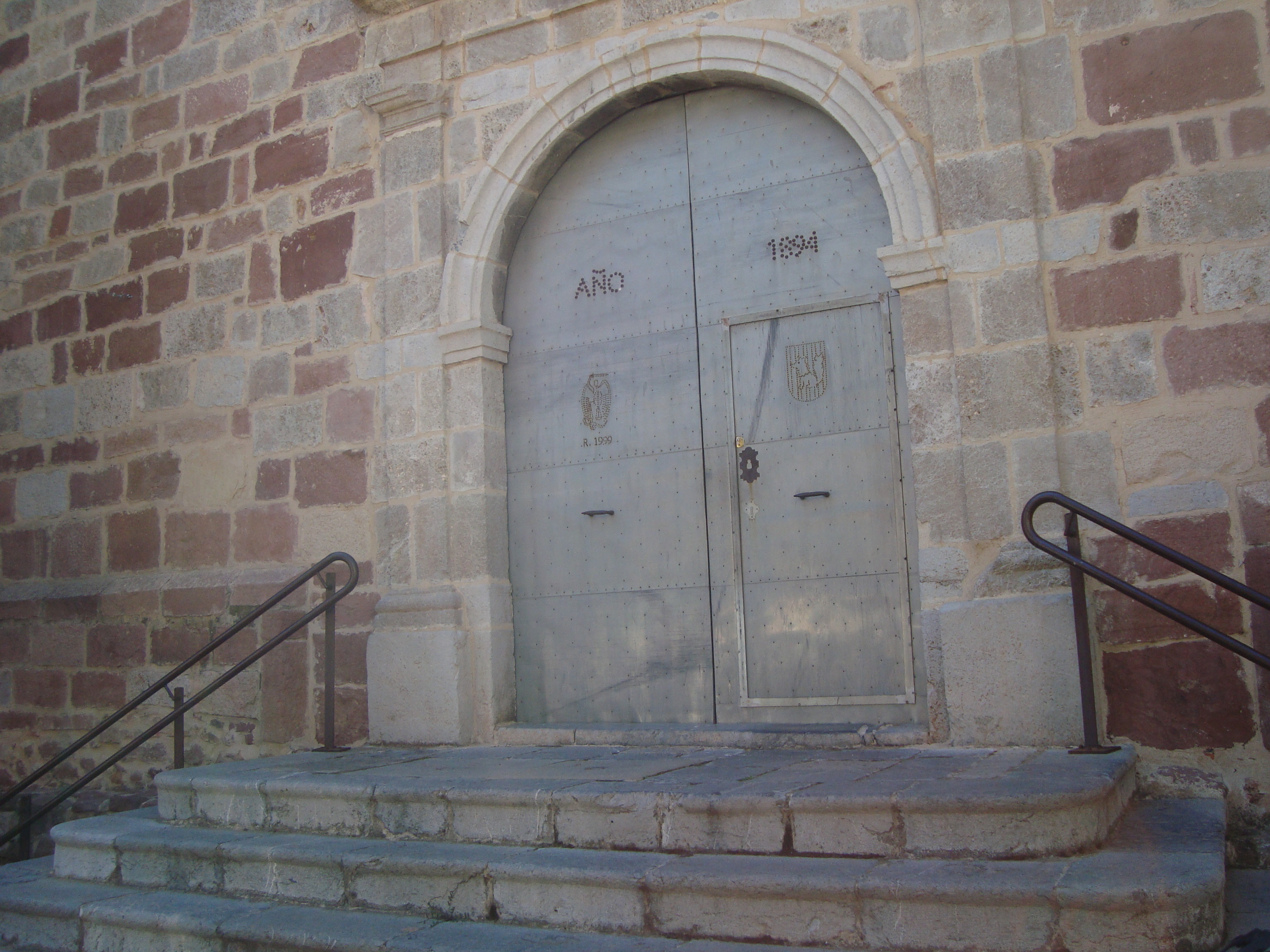
Església parroquial de Sant Miquel Arcàngel de Pobla Tornesa

La Pobla Tornesa is a municipality located in the province of Castellón, Valencian Community, Spain.
