= Fallas =

Traditional celebration in Valencia, Spain

Valencia Fallas Fallas de Valencia Falles de València
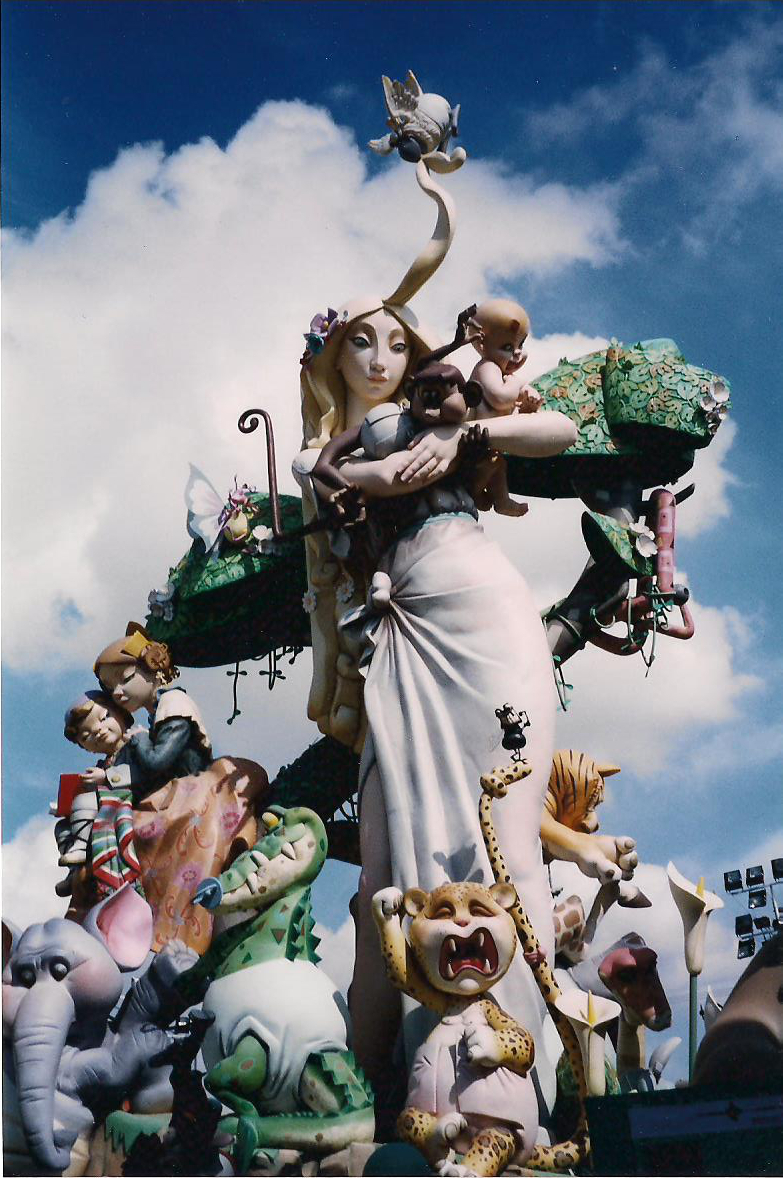
- Falla Na Jordana 2003 (1st prize)
- Date: 15 to 19 March
- Frequency: Annual
- Locations: Valencia, Spain

Fiesta of International Tourist Interest
- Designated: 1980

Valencia Fallas festival
- UNESCO Intangible Cultural Heritage
- Country: Spain
- Reference: 00859
- Region: Europe and North America

Inscription history
- Inscription: 2016 (11th session)
- List: Representative

The Fallas (Valencian: Falles; Spanish: Fallas) is a traditional celebration held annually in the city of Valencia, Spain; it is the patronal festival of the town. (Note: The patron saint of the city is Saint Joseph, therefore the festival takes place around this saint's day, 19 March.) The five main days celebrated are from 15 to 19 March, while the Mascletà, a pyrotechnic spectacle of firecracker detonation, takes place every day from 1 to 19 March. The term Fallas refers to both the celebration and the Falla monuments (Falla, singular; Fallas/Falles, plural) burnt during the celebration. The Fallas (Falles in Valencian) festival was added to UNESCO's intangible cultural heritage of humanity list on 30 November 2016. A number of towns in the Valencian Community have similar celebrations inspired by the original Fallas de Valencia festival. For example, the Bonfires of Saint John (Hogueras de San Juan or Fogueres de Sant Joan) in Alicante or the Fiestas de la Magdalena in Castellón de la Plana.

Each neighbourhood of the city has an organised group of people, the Commission, that meets at the Casal faller, and works all year long holding fundraising parties and dinners, usually featuring the noted dish paella, a specialty of the region. Each commission produces a construction known as falla which is burned the last day of the celebration. Currently there are approximately 400 registered commissions in Valencia.

== Etymology ==
The name of the festival is the plural of the Valencian word falla. The word's derivation is as follows:

Latin fax (accusative facem), "torch" → Latin facula (diminutive; accusative faculam) → Vulgar Latin *faclam → Valencian falla.

== Falles and ninots ==
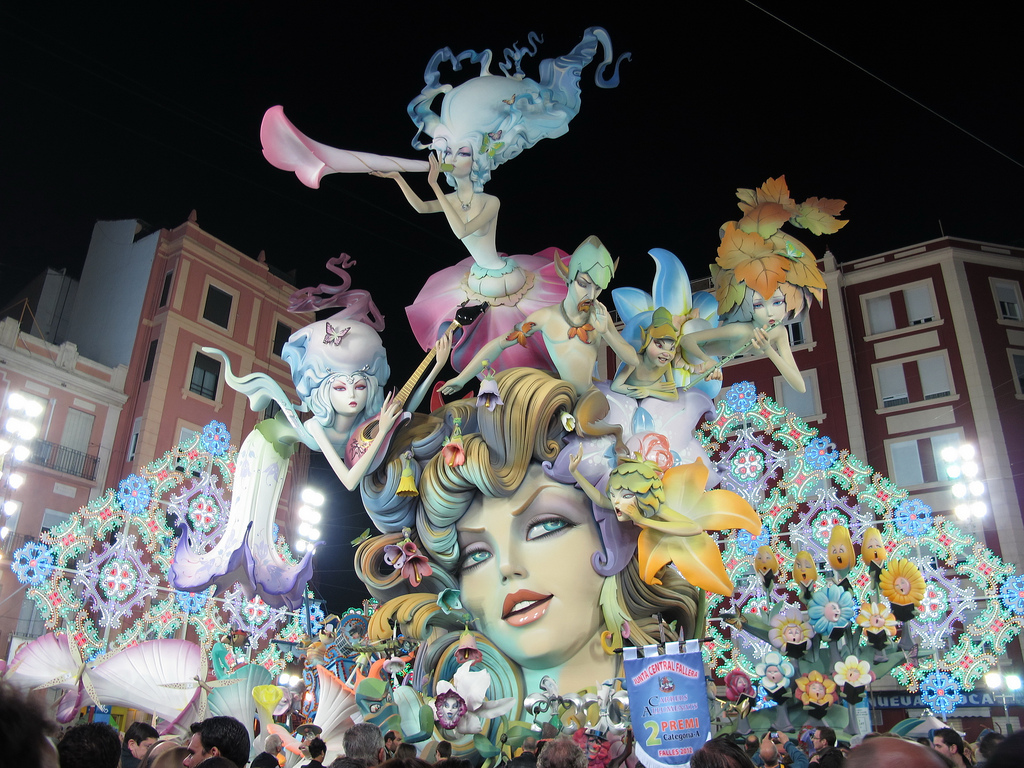
Falla Cuba 2012 (2nd prize)

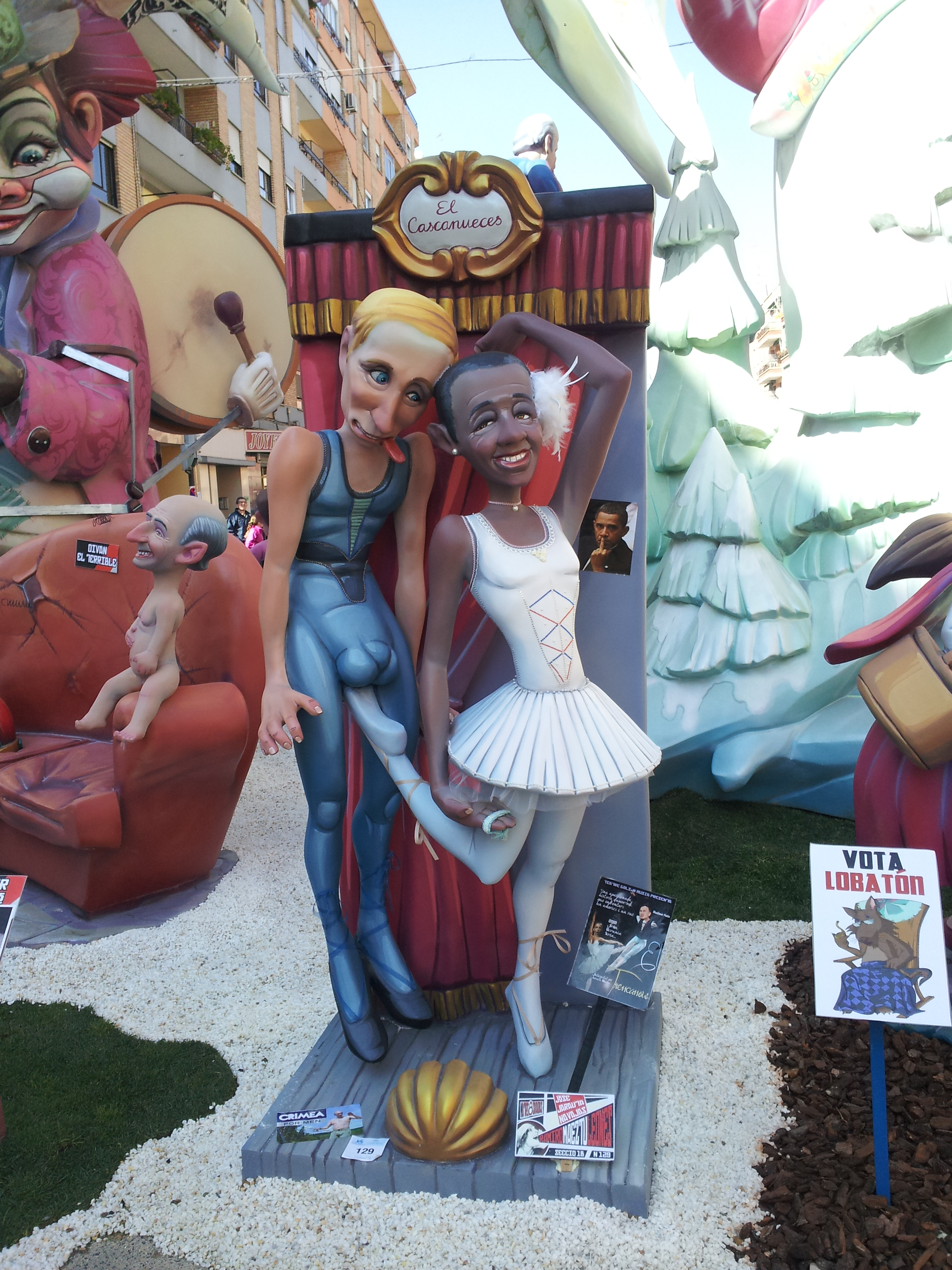
Ninots representing Barack Obama and Vladimir Putin (parodying The Nutcracker) in 2015

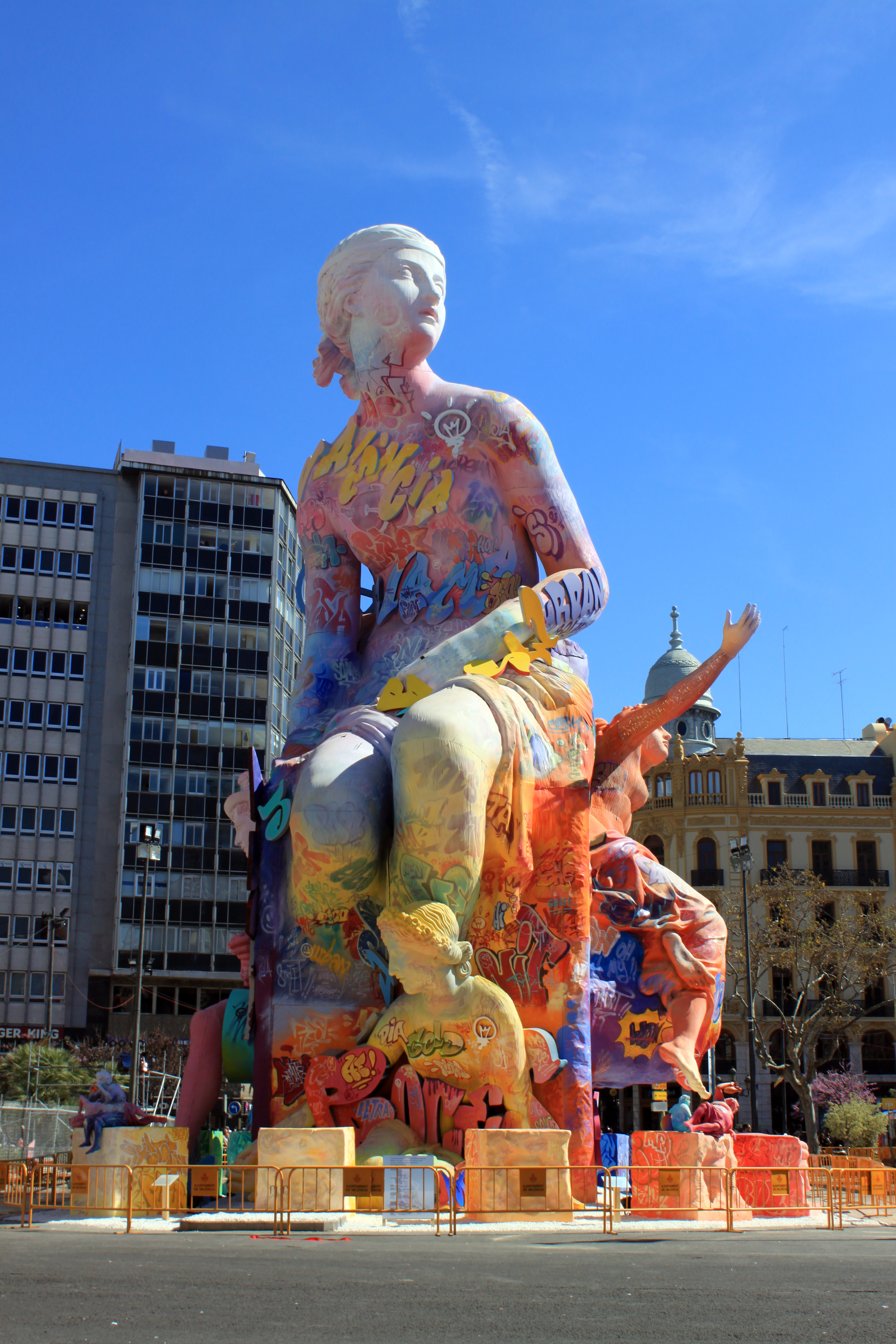
Fallas 2019 from Valencia

Formerly, much time would be spent by the casal faller preparing the ninots (Valencian name for puppets or dolls). Traditionally during the four days leading up to 19 March, each group takes its ninot out for a grand parade, and then mounts it, each on its own elaborate firecracker-filled cardboard and paper-mâché artistic monument, in a street of the given neighbourhood. This whole assembly is a falla. Today the grand parade is held much earlier and forms the official commencement of the construction work.

The ninots and their falles are constructed according to an agreed-upon theme that has traditionally been a satirical jab at whatever draws the attention of the fallers (the registered participants of the casals). In modern times, the two-week-long festival has spawned a substantial local industry, to the point that an entire suburban area has been designated the Ciutat fallera (Falles City). Here, crews of artists and artisans, sculptors, painters, and other craftsmen, all spend months producing elaborate constructions of paper and wax, wood and polystyrene foam tableaux towering up to five stories, composed of fanciful figures, often caricatures, in provocative poses arranged in a gravity-defying manner. Each of them is produced under the direction of one of the many individual neighbourhood casals fallers who vie with each other to attract the best artists, and then to create the most outrageous allegorical monument to their target. There are about 750 of these neighbourhood associations in Valencia, with over 200,000 members, or a quarter of the city's population.

Since 1934 each of the fallas sends one of their figures to a competition, the Exposició del Ninot. This competition, which is won by popular vote, determines which of the ninots will be spared from burning (ninot indultat). This ninot will go on to be placed in the Museo Fallero.

During Fallas, many people wear their casal faller dress of regional and historical costumes from different eras of València's history. The dolçaina (an oboe-like reed instrument) and tabalet (a kind of Valencian drum) are frequently heard, as most of the different casals fallers have their own traditional bands.

Although the Falles is a very traditional event and many participants dress in medieval clothing, the ninots for 2005 included such modern characters as Shrek and George W. Bush, and the 2012 Falles included characters like Barack Obama and Lady Gaga. A literary contest organised annually since 1903 by the Lo Rat Penat cultural association recognises the work of local poets who write satirical verses in Valencian that explain these characters. The faller verses are collected in booklets (llibrets) and distributed to participants.

== Events during Fallas ==
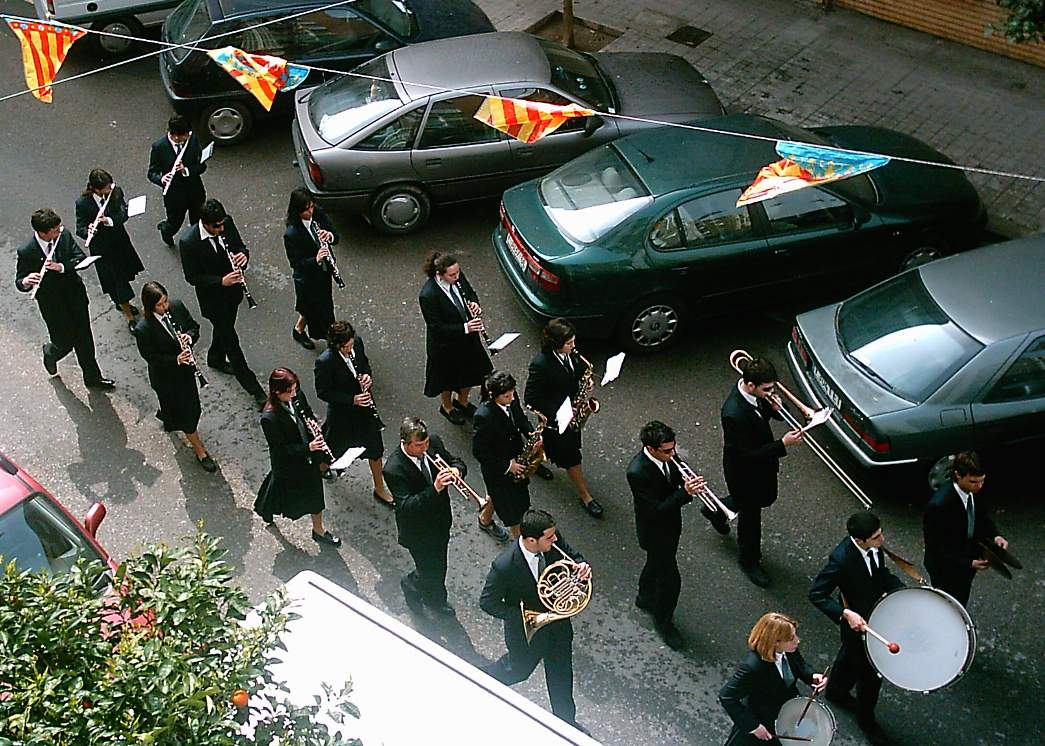
La despertà: a band of wind instruments marches through a small street in the early morning.

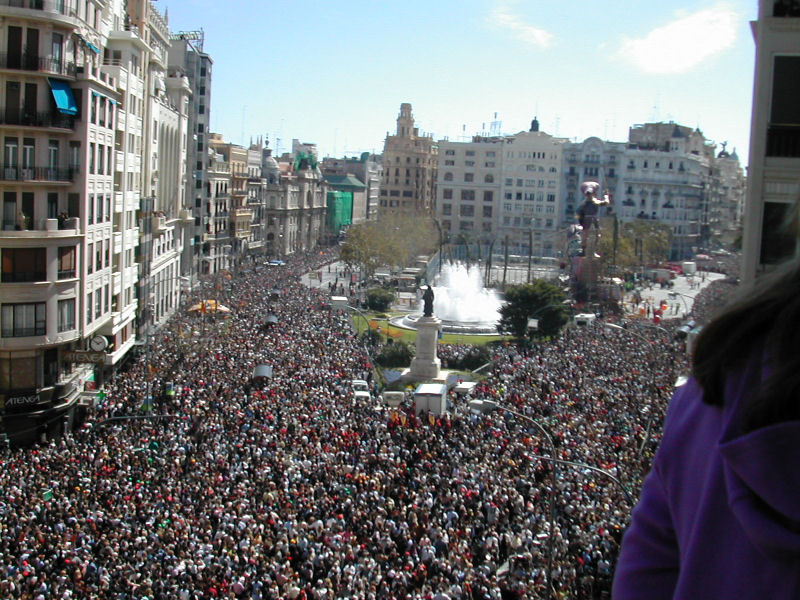
The crowd gathers in the main square, Valencia, Spain

The five days and nights of Fallas might be described as a continuous street party. There are a multitude of processions: historical, religious, and comedic. Crowds in the restaurants spill out into the streets. Explosions can be heard all day long and sporadically through the night. Everyone from small children to elderly people can be seen throwing fireworks and noisemakers in the streets, which are littered with pyrotechnical debris. The timing of the events is fixed, and they fall on the same date every year, though there has been discussion about holding some events on the weekend preceding the Fallas, to take greater advantage of the tourist potential of the festival or changing the end date in years where it is due to occur in midweek.

But outside the Fallas proper, the Fallas season within the Valencian Community begins on the final Sunday of February and lasts till 19 March, St. Joseph's Day.

=== Opening Night (La Crida) ===
Held on the last Sunday of February, La Crida is held in the evening at the Torres de Serranos, one of the historical gateways to the city. Preceded by a fireworks display and a son et lumierie show, the city's mayor presents the keys to the Fallera Major and her princess, and after their addresses formally declaring the commencement of the festivities, the Himne de l'Exposició and Marcha Real are played by the city band to mark the formal start of the festivity season.

=== La Despertà ===
Each day of Falles begins at 8:00 am with La Despertà ("the wake-up call"). Brass bands appear from the casals and begin to march down every street playing lively music. Close behind them are the fallers, throwing large firecrackers in the street as they go.

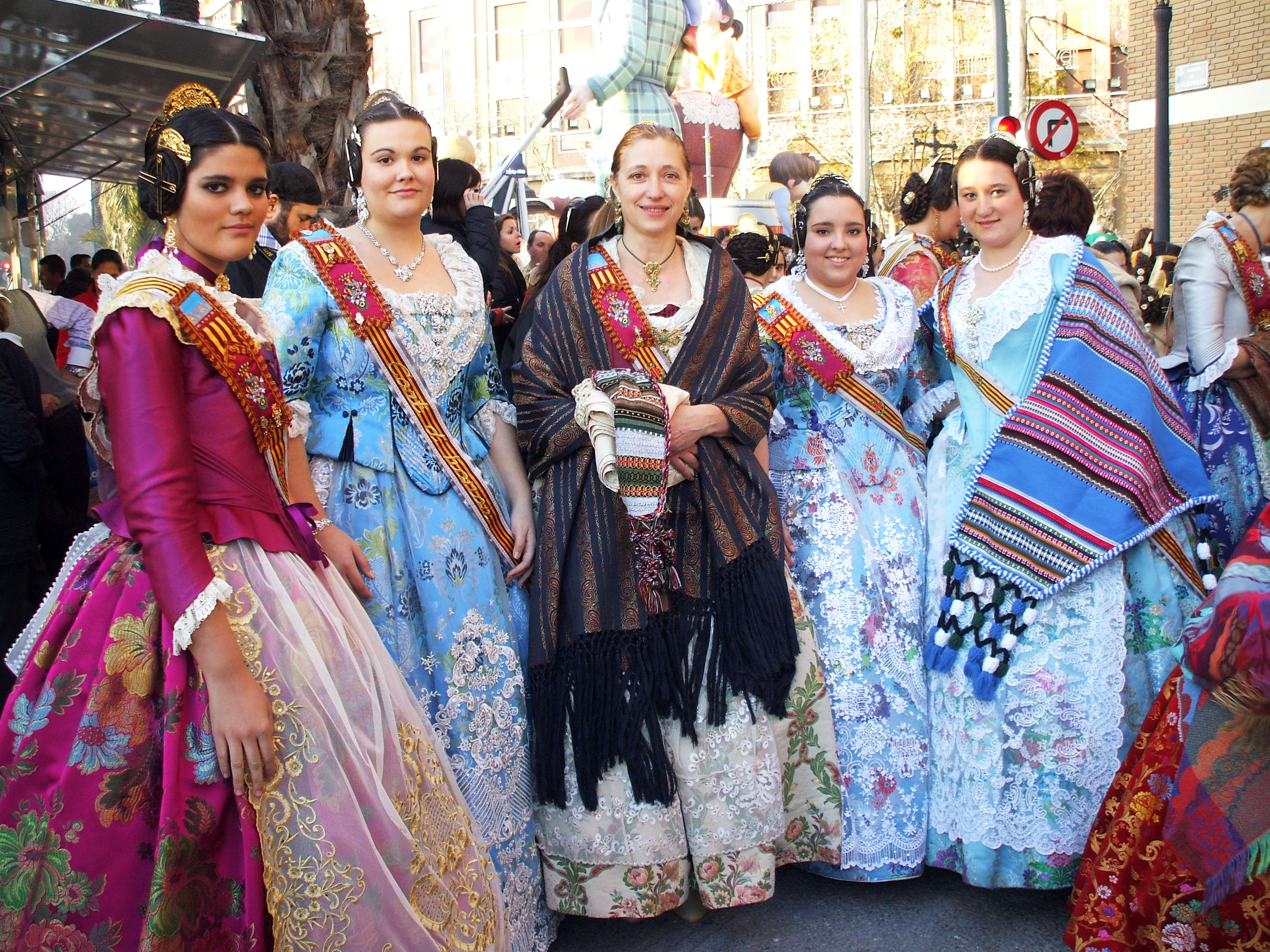
Falleras during the "replegà"

=== La Mascletà ===
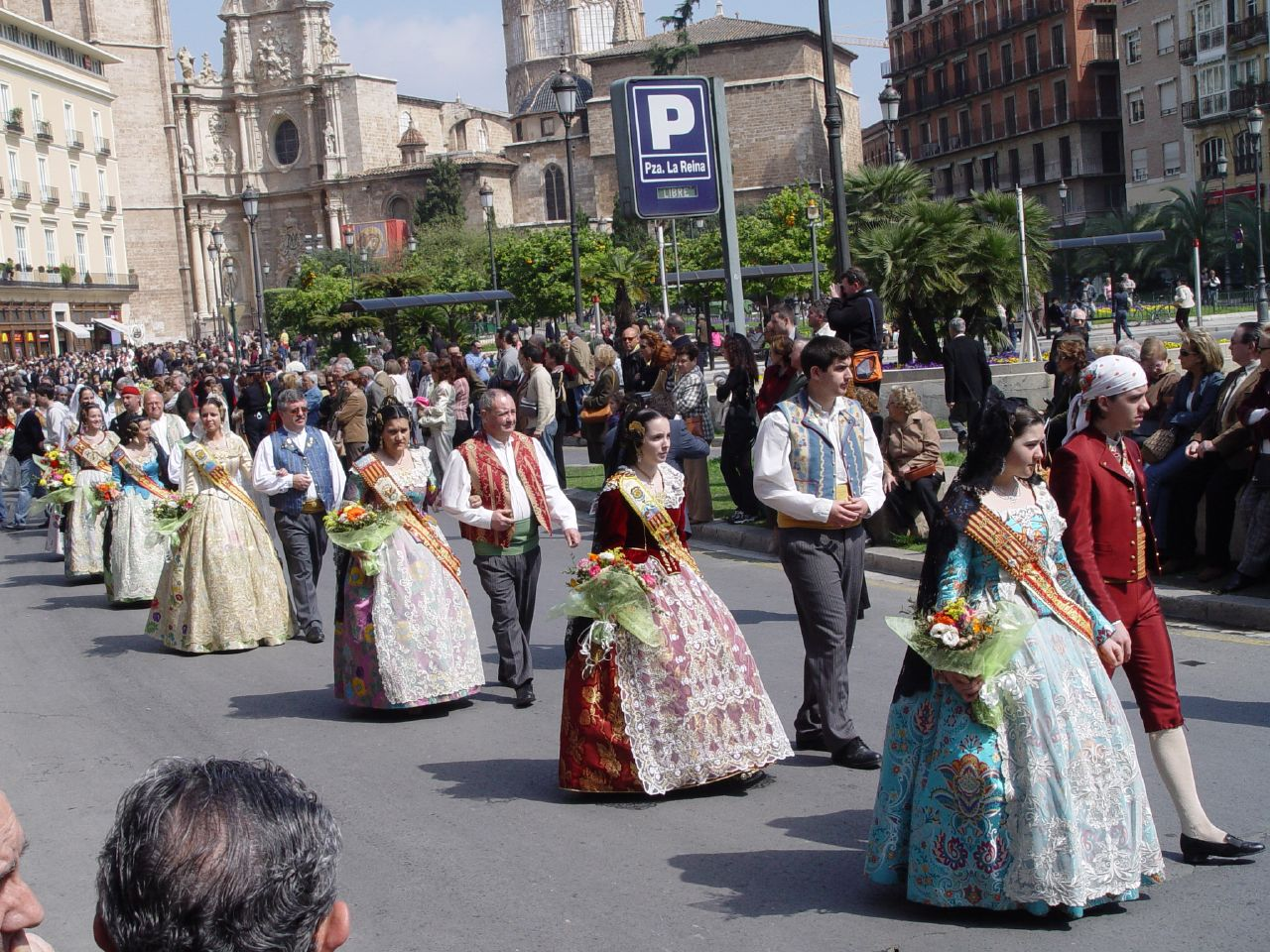
Falleres in their costumes march with the band

The Mascletà, an explosive barrage of coordinated firecracker and fireworks displays, takes place at 2:00 pm from March 1 to 19 (including the festival proper); the main event is the municipal Mascletà in the Plaça de l'Ajuntament where the pyrotechnicians compete for the honour of providing the final Mascletà of the festes (on 19 March). At 2:00 pm the clock chimes and the Fallera Major, dressed in her fallera finery, will call from the balcony of City Hall, Senyor/a pirotècnic/a, pot començar la mascletà! ("Mr./Ms. Pyrotechnic, the Mascletà may commence!"), and the Mascletà begins.

The Mascletà is almost unique to the Valencian Community, and very popular with the Valencian people. Smaller neighbourhoods often hold their own mascletà for saints' days, weddings and other celebrations.

A nighttime variant runs in the evening hours by the same pyrotechnicans that were present in the afternoon. In some days, women pyrotechnicians are selected to compete. The event is televised regionwide.

=== La Plantà ===
On the day of the 15th before 8 am, in a tradition called the Plantà, all of the falles infantils are to be finished being constructed, and next morning before 8 am falles majors (big Falles) are to be completed. If not, they face disqualification.

Once the City Falles Major is finally done, as well as the rest of the falles majors, a fireworks display – Amb de las Falles – is held at City Hall Square to pay tribute to everyone who made these works possible.

A few days later, the Central Board of the Falles officially declares, in a televised press conference, the champions of both the main and children's categories, whose works were overseen by judges and the Junta Central, not only during the stages of construction and the Planta, but after their completion.

=== L'Ofrena de flors ===
In this event, the flower offering, each of the casals fallers takes an offering of flowers to the Virgin Mary, titled as Our Lady of the Forsaken, principal patroness of the city of Valencia and the wider Community. This occurs all day during 17–18 March, with the two days attended by the Fallera Majors and their royal court, Day 1 by the Children's Fallera Major and Day 2 by the main Fallera Major. A statue of the Virgin Mary and its large pedestal are then covered with all the flowers given from all the people of the casals fallers and visitors from across the Valencian Community and overseas who give them to attendants. The parade route covers much of the Old City of Valencia, with the statue being located in Plaza of the Mother of God, nearest to the city cathederal and the Basilica of Our Lady of the Forsaken.

=== Els Castells and La Nit del Foc ===
On the nights of the 15, 16, 17, and 18th there are firework displays in the old riverbed in València. Each night is progressively grander and the last is called La Nit del Foc (the Night of Fire).

=== Cavalcada del Foc ===
On the final evening of Falles, at 7:00 pm on 19 March, a parade known in Valencian as the Cavalcada del Foc (the Fire Parade) takes place along Colón street and Porta de la Mar square. This celebration of fire, the symbol of the fiesta's spirit, is the grand finale of Fallas and an event featuring exhibitions of the varied rites and displays from around the world which use fire; it incorporates floats, giant mechanisms, people in costumes, rockets, gunpowder, street performances and music. Led by the royal court and the festival queens from various parts of the Valencian Community, the current parade takes around an hour or more and ends with the fireworks display at Porta de la Mar.

=== La Cremà ===
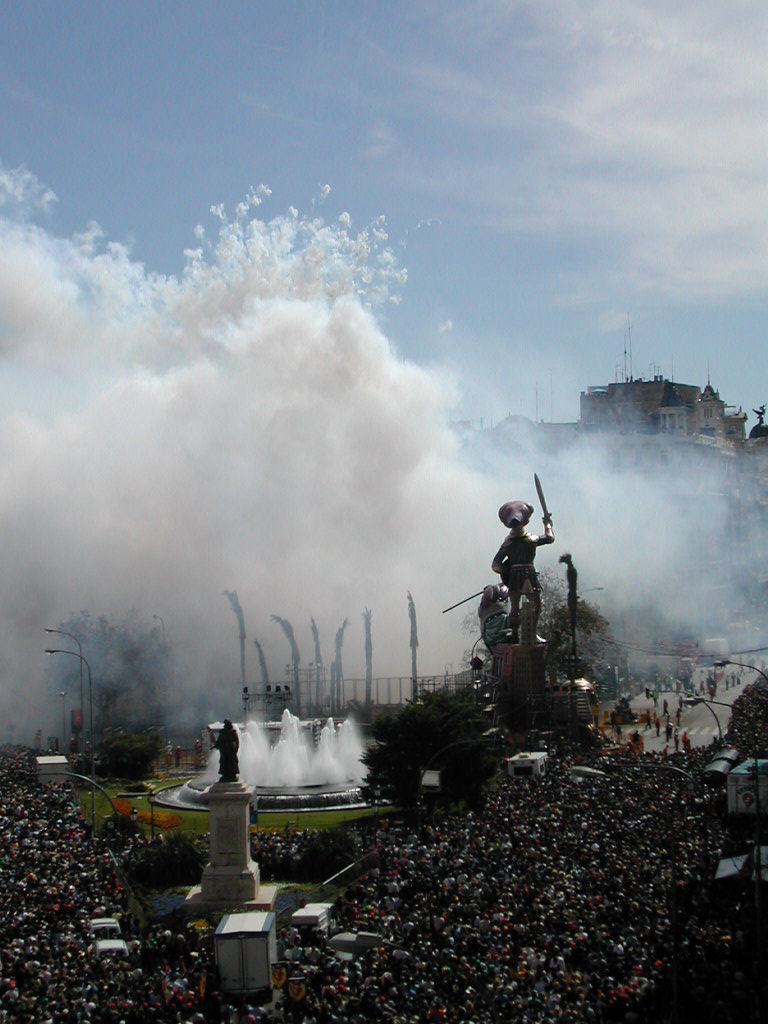
Mascletà in Valencia

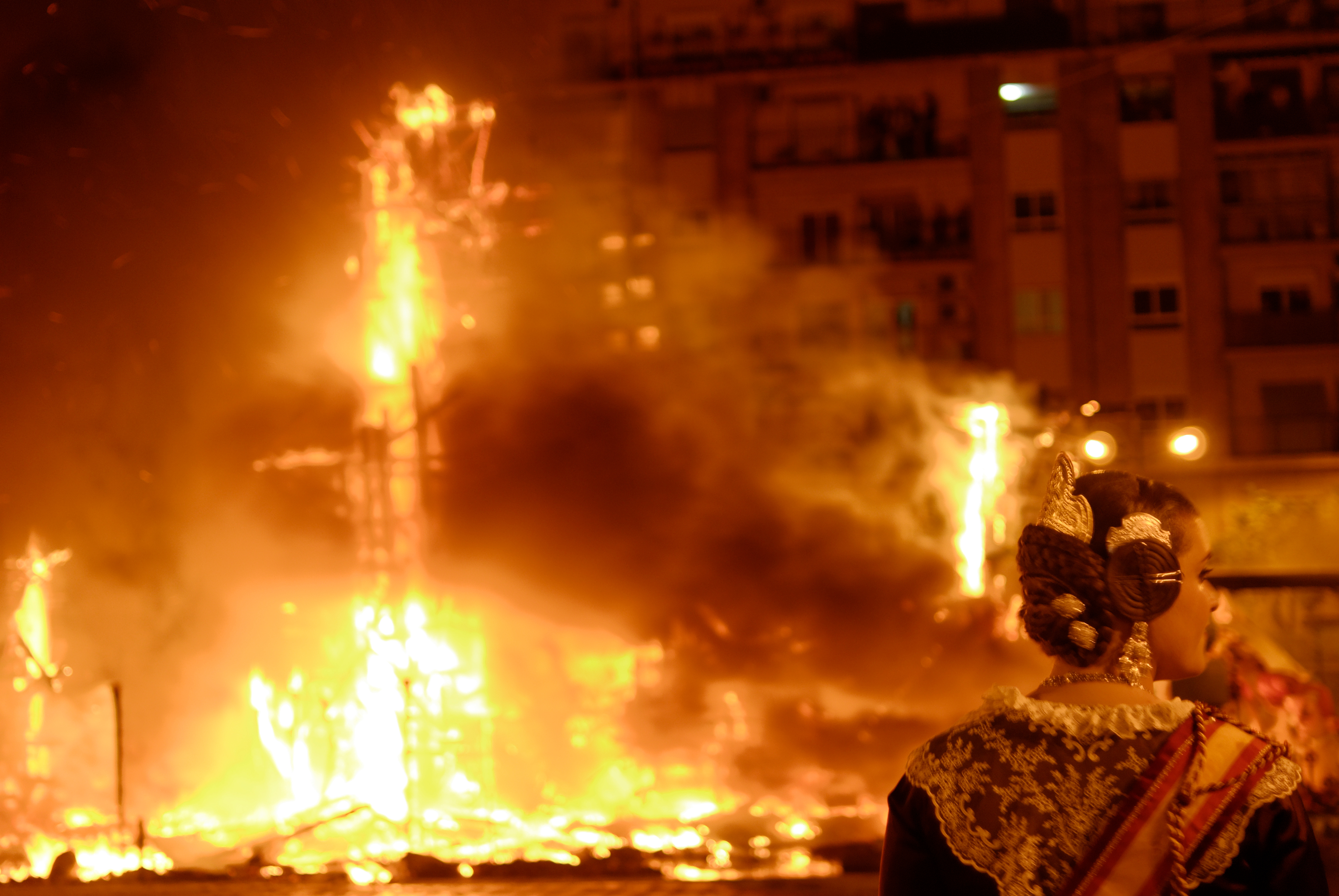
A fallera, during the burning of her falla

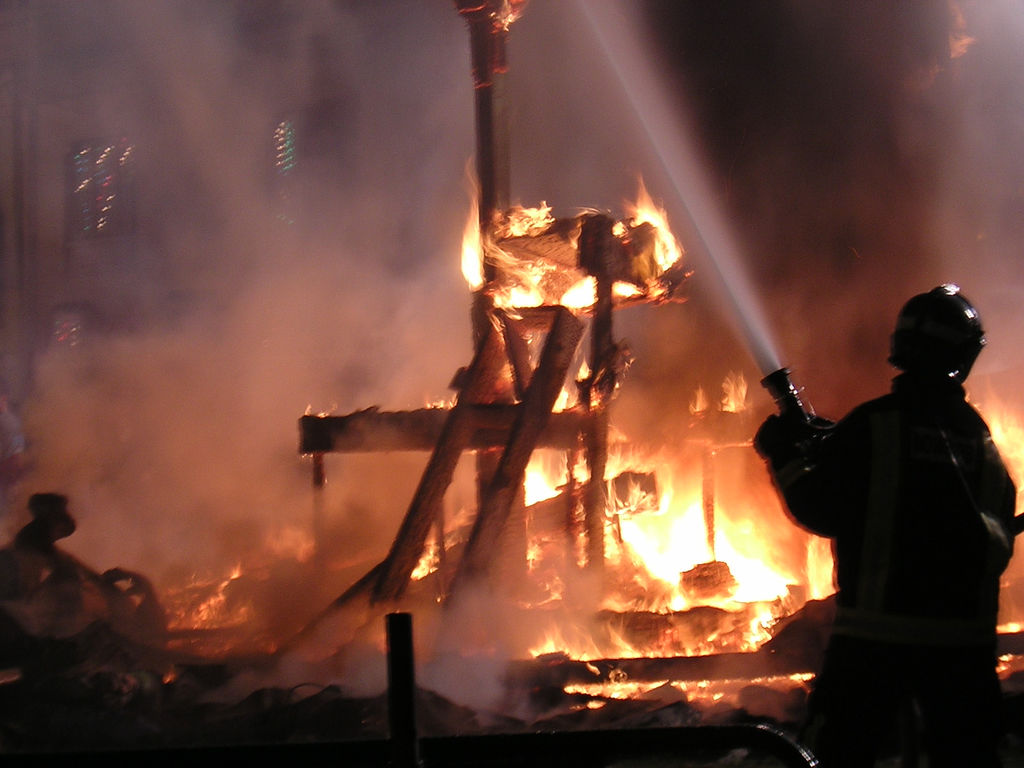
La cremà, 2002

On the final night of Falles, around midnight on 19 March, these falles are burnt as huge bonfires. This is known as La Cremà (the Burning), the climax of the whole event, and the reason why the constructions are called falles ("torches"). Traditionally, the falla in the Plaça de l'Ajuntament is burned last.

All commissions have a falla infantil (children's falles, smaller and without satirical themes), which are held a few meters away from the main one. This is burnt first, at 8:00 pm. The main neighbourhood falles are burnt at 10.00 pm; the burning of the falles in the city centre often starts later. For example, in 2005, the fire brigade delayed the burning of the Egyptian funeral falla in Carrer del Convent de Jerusalem until 1:30 am, when they were sure all safety concerns were addressed.

Each falla is laden with fireworks which are lit first. The construction itself is lit either after or during the explosion of these fireworks. Falles burn quite quickly, and the heat given off is felt by all around. The heat from the larger ones often drives the crowd back a couple of metres, even though they are already behind barriers that the fire brigade has set several meters from the construction. In narrower streets, the heat scorches the surrounding buildings, and the firemen douse their fronts, window blinds, street signs, etc. with water hoses to stop them catching fire or melting, from the beginning of the cremà until it cools down.

Away from the falles, people frolic in the streets, throwing fireworks around randomly, with many stalls selling trinkets and snacks such as the typical fried porres, churros and bunyols, as well as roasted chestnuts.

While the smaller fallas dotted around the streets are burned at approximately the same time, the last falla to be burned is the main one, which is saved until last so that everybody can watch it. This main falla is found outside the Ajuntament – the city hall building. People arrive a few hours before the scheduled burning time to get a front row view. This final falla is burned in public after the signal from the Fallera Major to officially commence.

=== Traditional dress ===
The traditional dress worn by "fallers" (males) has changed from black trousers and black jacket with white shirt and other motives, to colorful and a more traditional and historic custom with many decorations. These dresses can be very expensive but not as much as the dresses of the "reines falleras" (queens of the festival) and the Royal Court. Prices of female traditional dresses can vary from 2,000 euros to more than 20,000 euros. Some of them are astonishing in beauty. They are accompanied with traditional hair styles and jewelry.

== History ==
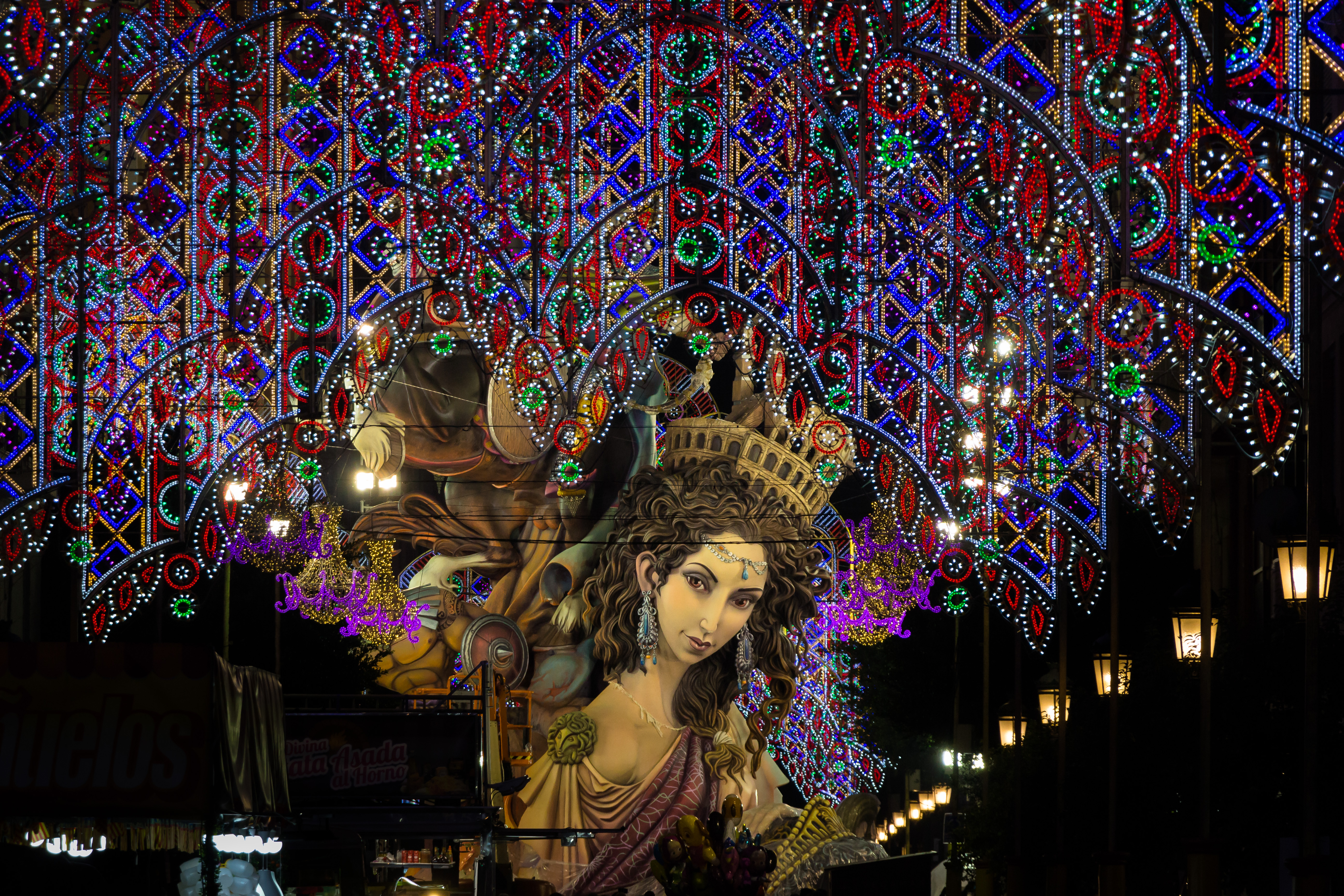
Street lighting of Sueca-Literato Azorín in 2017

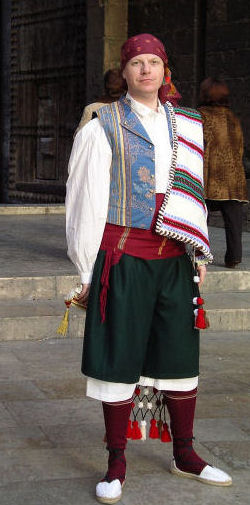
Saragüells, a traditional Valencian costume for the men

There are different conjectures regarding the origin of the Fallas festival. One suggests that the Fallas started in the Middle Ages, when artisans disposed of the broken artefacts and pieces of wood they saved during the winter by burning them to celebrate the spring equinox. Valencian carpenters used planks of wood called parots to hang their candles on during the winter, as these were needed to provide light to work by. With the coming of the spring, they were no longer necessary, so they were burned. Over time, and with the intervention of the Church, the date of the burning of these parots was made to coincide with the celebration of the festival of Saint Joseph, the patron saint of carpenters.

This tradition continued to evolve. The parot was dressed with clothing so that it looked like a person; features identifiable with some well-known person from the neighbourhood were often added as well. To collect these materials, children went from house to house asking for una estoreta velleta (an old rug) to add to the parot. This became a popular song that the children sang as they gathered all sorts of old flammable furniture and utensils to burn in the bonfire with the parot. These parots were the first ninots. Over the years, people of the neighbourhoods began to organise the building of the falles, and thus the typically intricate constructions, including their various figures, were born.

Until the beginning of the 20th century, the falles were tall boxes with three or four wax dolls dressed in fabric clothing. This changed when the creators began to use cardboard. The fabrication of the falles continues to evolve in modern times, when the largest displays are made of polystyrene and soft cork easily molded with hot saws. These techniques have allowed the creation of falles over 30 metres high.

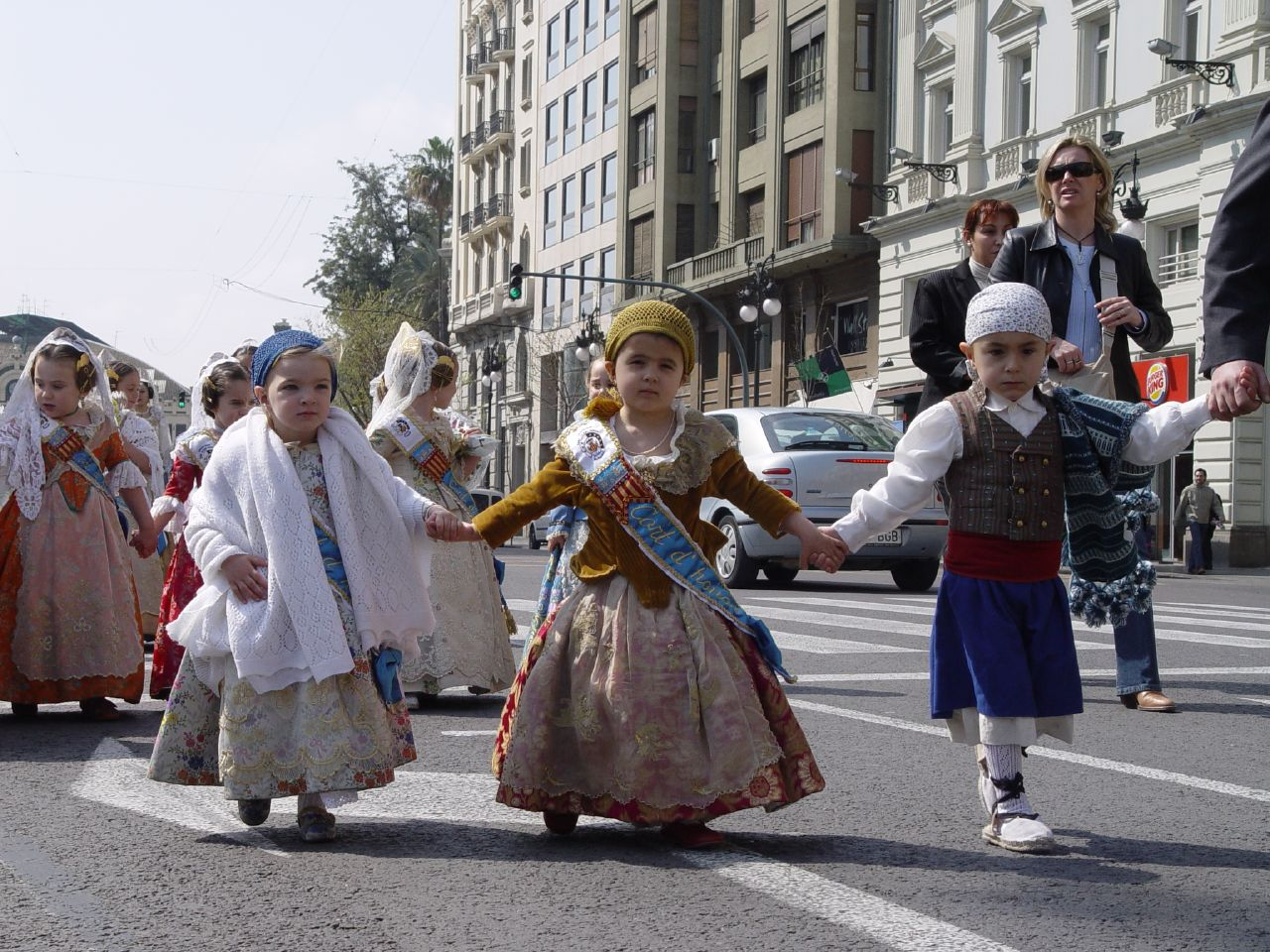
Children walking in costume of Valencia

The origin of the pagan festival is similar to that of the Bonfires of Saint John celebrated in the Alicante region, in the sense that both came from the Latin custom of lighting fires to welcome spring. In València, this ancient tradition led to the burning of accumulated waste, particularly wood, at the end of winter on the feast day of Saint Joseph. Given the reputed humorous character of Valencians, it was natural that the people began to burn figurines depicting persons and events of the past year. The burning symbolised liberation from living in servitude to the memory of these events or else represented humorous and often critical commentary on them. The festival thus evolved a more satirical and ironic character, and the wooden castoffs gradually came to be assembled into progressively more elaborate 'monuments' that were designed and painted in advance.

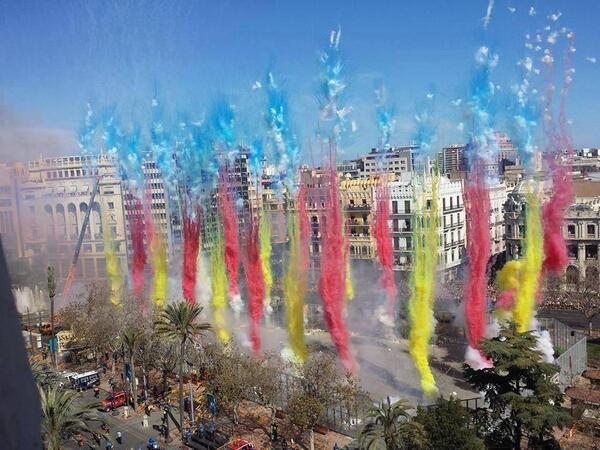
Start of Fallas 2014

In the early 20th century, and especially during the Spanish Civil War, the monuments became more anti-clerical in nature and were often highly critical of the local or national governments, which tried to ban the Falles many times, without success. Under the dictatorship of Francisco Franco the celebration lost much of its satirical nature because of government censorship, but the monuments were among the few fervent public expressions allowed then, and they could be made freely in València. During this period, many religious customs such as the offering of flowers to Mare de Déu dels Desamparats (Our Lady of the Forsaken) were taken up, which today are essential parts of the festival, even though they were unrelated to the original purpose of the celebration.

With the restoration of democracy and the end of government censorship, the critical falles reappeared, and obscene satirical ones with them. Despite thirty years of freedom of expression, the world view of the faller can still be socially conservative, is often sexist and may involve some of the amoralism of Valencian politics. This has sometimes led to criticism by certain cultural critics, environmentalists, and progressives. Yet there are celebrants of all ideologies and factions, and they have different interpretations of the spirit of the celebration. Although recent initiatives such as the pilota championships, literary competitions and other events have broadened its cultural expression, the city still embraces such ancient traditions to express its own singular identity.

=== Fallas suspensions ===
Throughout its history the Fallas have been suspended six times.

In 1886 the fallers refused to place the monuments in protest against the increase of the canon from 5 pesetas to 60 pesetas imposed in 1851 that penalized their placement on the street. The follow-up was not complete and there were two failures.

In 1896 a state of war was declared because of the Spanish American War, and the Fallas were annulled two days before its beginning.

In the years 1937, 1938 and 1939, the Fallas were suspended due to the Spanish Civil War. The suspension did not affect the Fallas of 1936 since they had already been held when the war started. The money destined for the Fallas was destined to the republican cause at the beginning of the war.

On 10 March 2020, the Valencian Generalitat, after a Ministry of Health report, decided to suspend and postpone the parties of Fallas and all the acts that comprise it as a result of the coronavirus epidemic as a preventive measure to stop the spread of the virus. The festival was cancelled in 2021 and returned in 2022.

== Secció Especial ==
The Secció Especial is a group of the largest and most prestigious falles commissions in the city of Valencia. In 2007, the group consisted of 14 commissions. This class of falles was first started in 1942 and originally included the falles of Barques, Reina-Pau and Plaça del Mercat. Currently, none of these are still in the group. The commission that has most often participated in this group as of 2015 was Na Jordana, with 62 times. The Secció Especial awards the prizes with the exception of the one awarded by the Valencia City Council; winning the first prize in the Secció Especial is the most prestigious prize any falla can win. All other falles fall into different classes (18 as of 2017) determined by the amount of money invested in each of these works.

Recent winners of Secció Especial

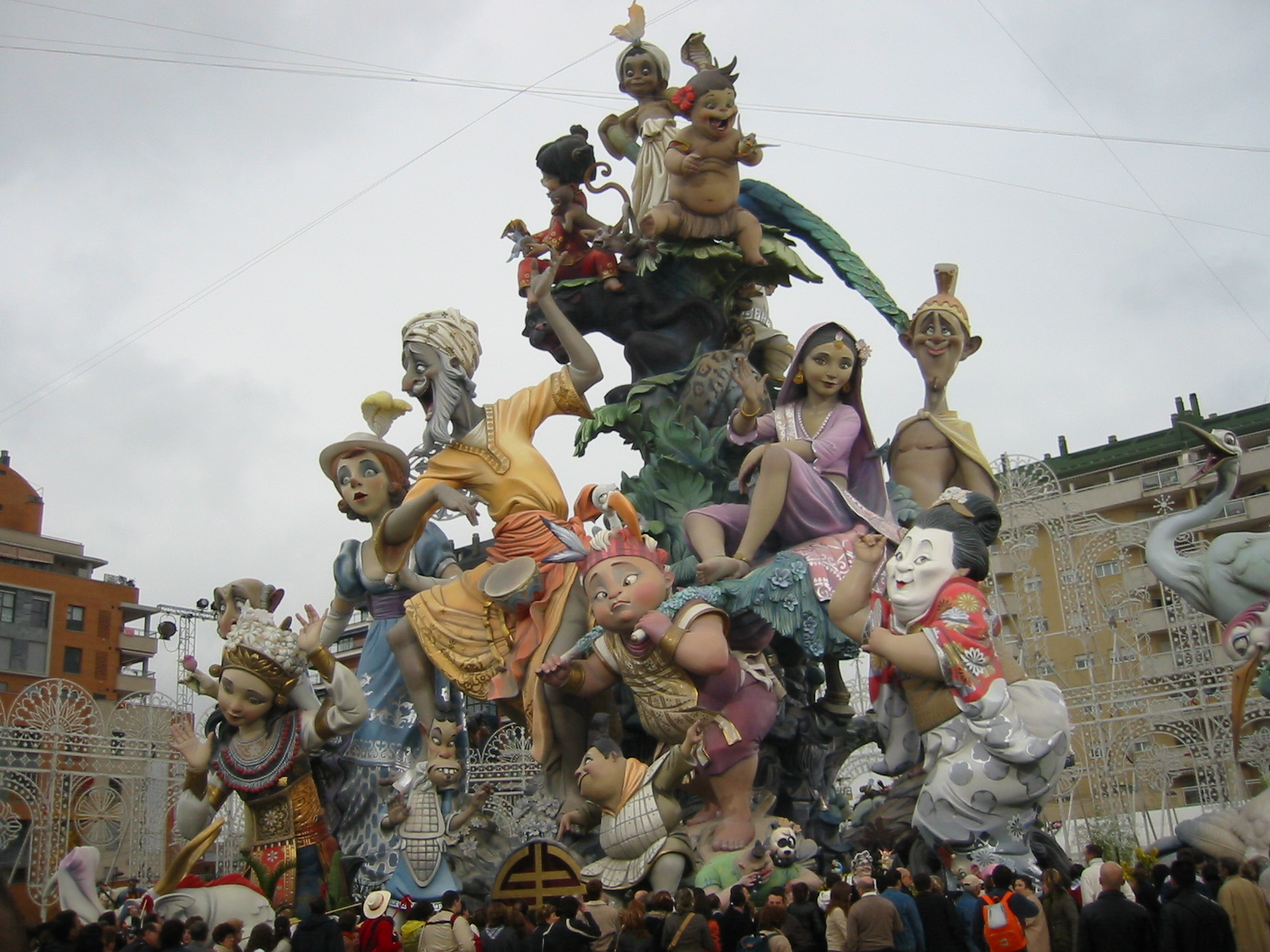
2006: Nou Campanar

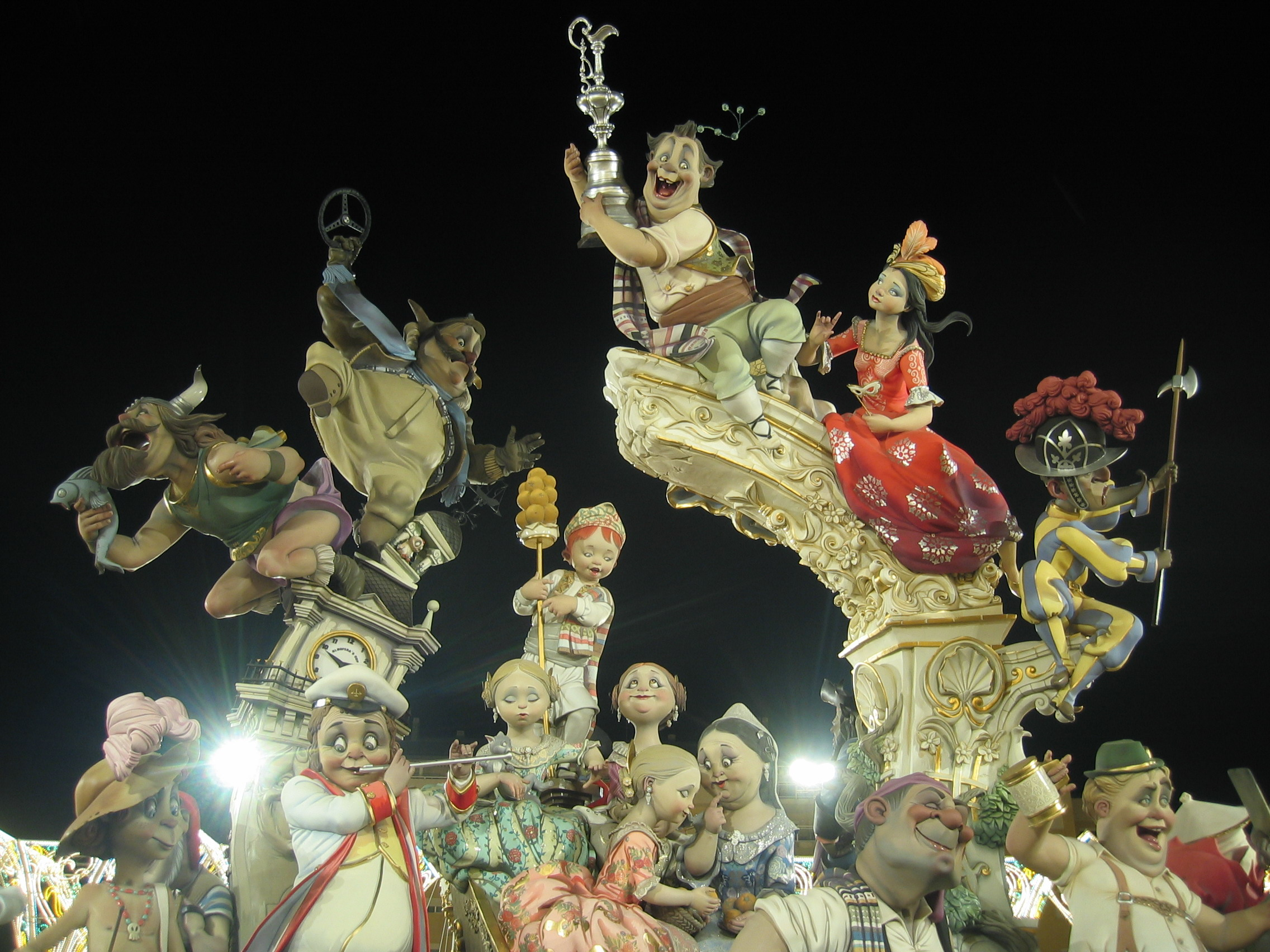
2007: Nou Campanar

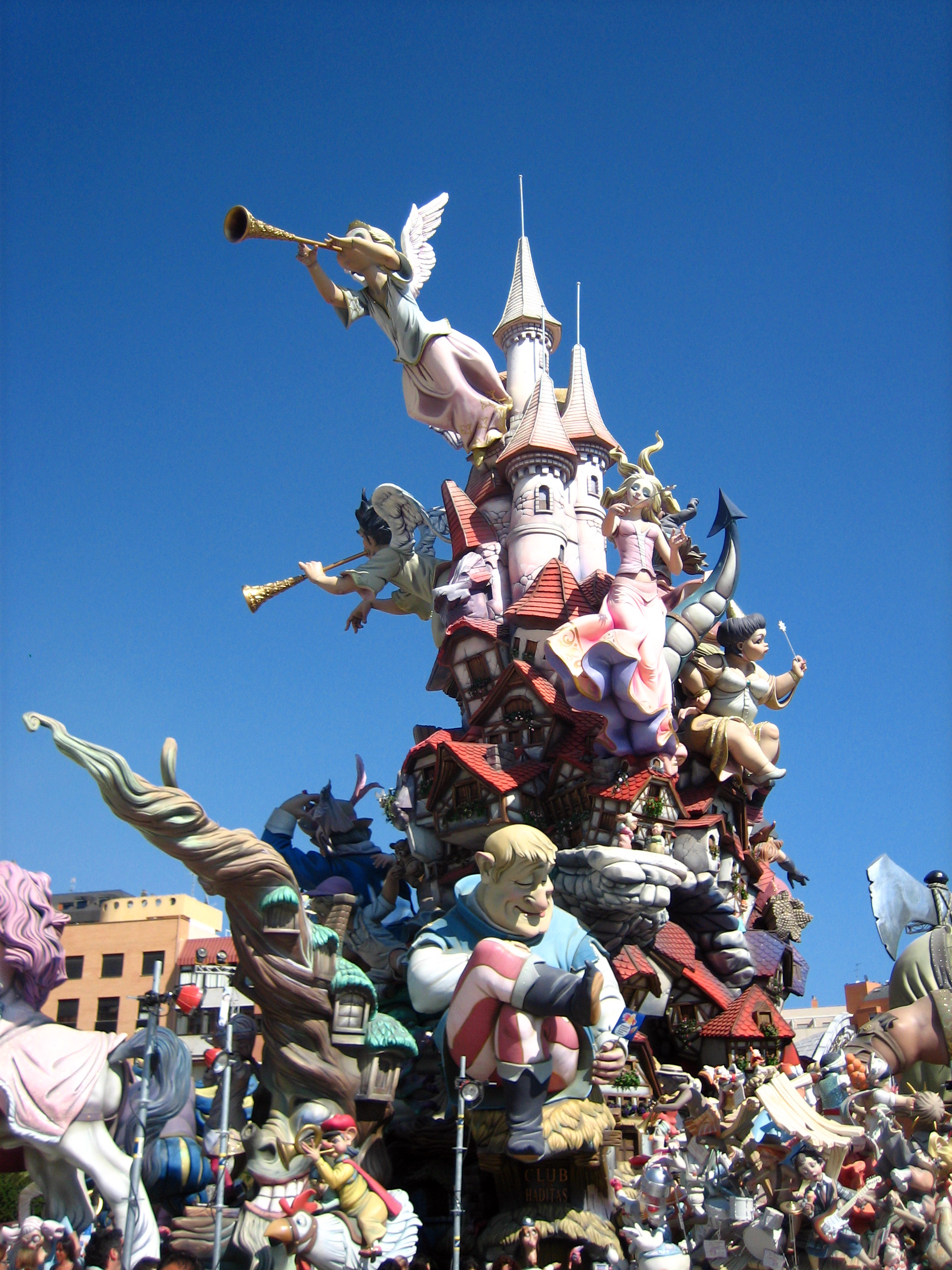
2008: Nou Campanar

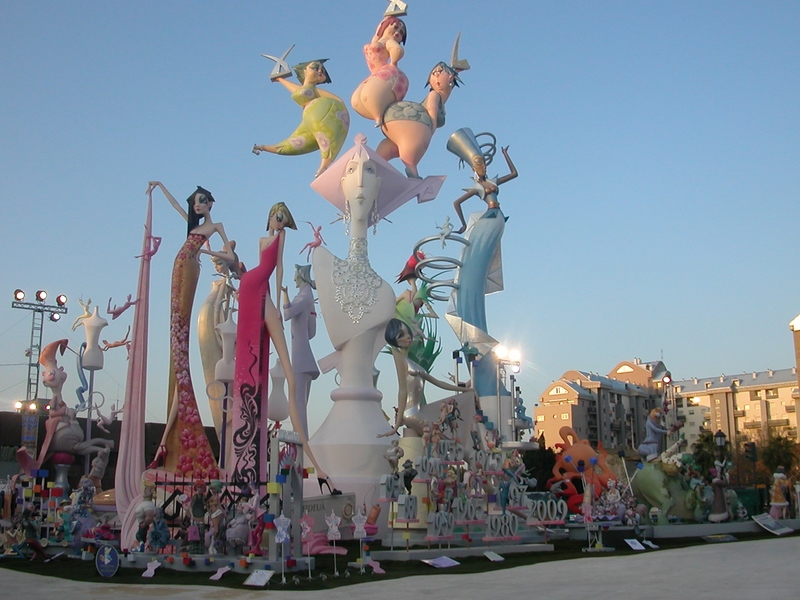
2009: Nou Campanar

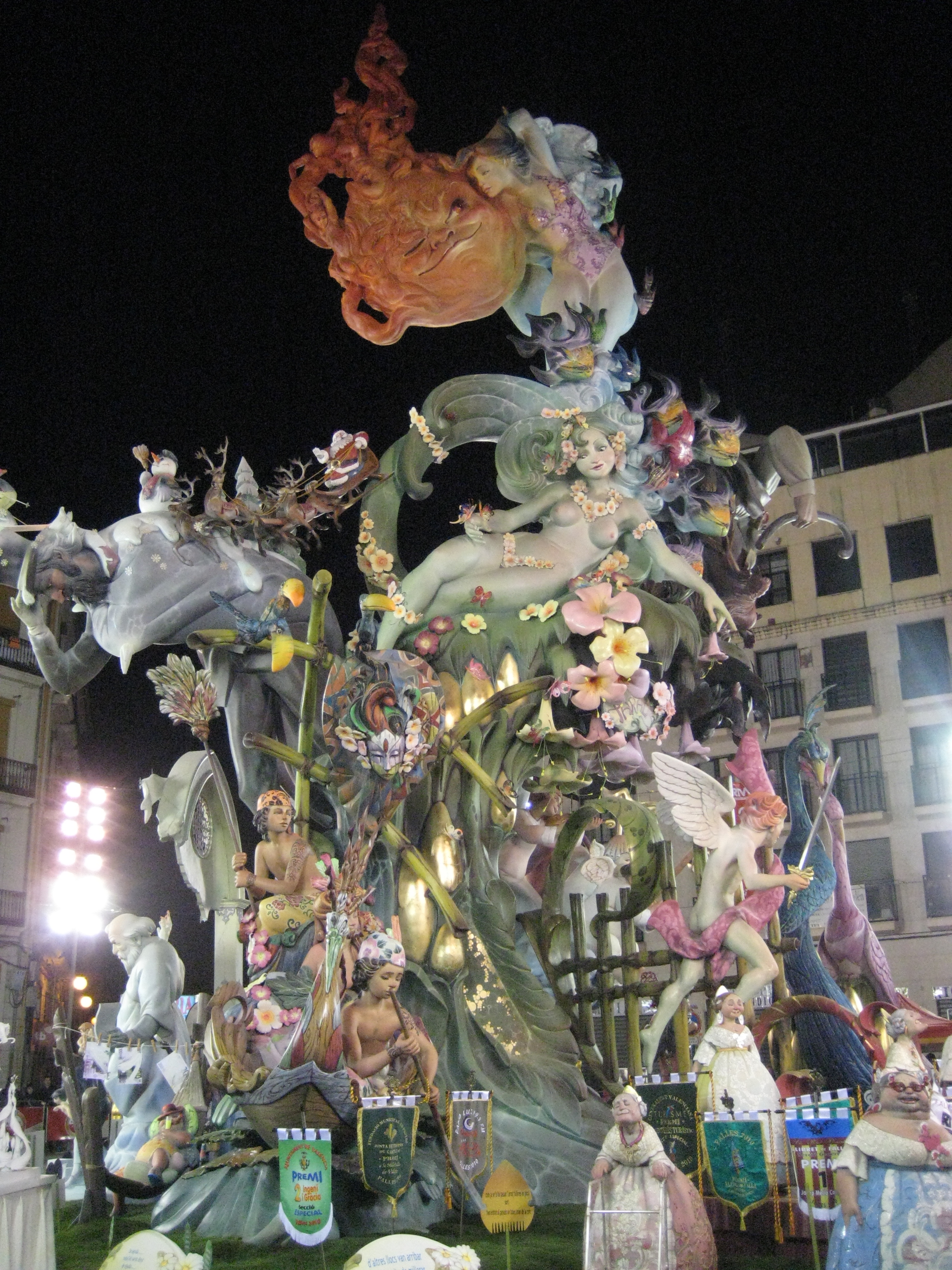
2010: Convent Jerusalem-Matemàtic Marzal

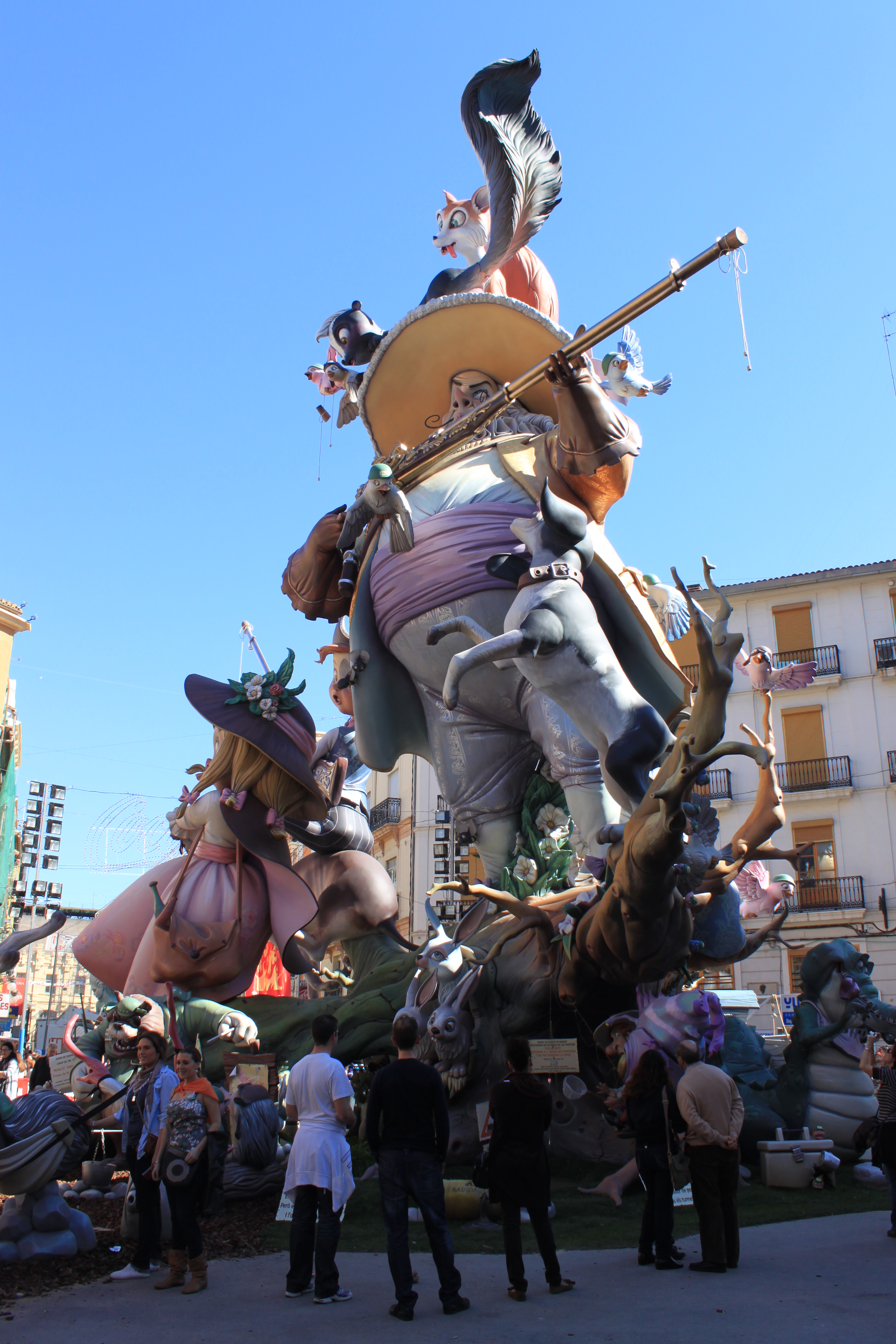
2011: Convent Jerusalem-Matemàtic Marzal

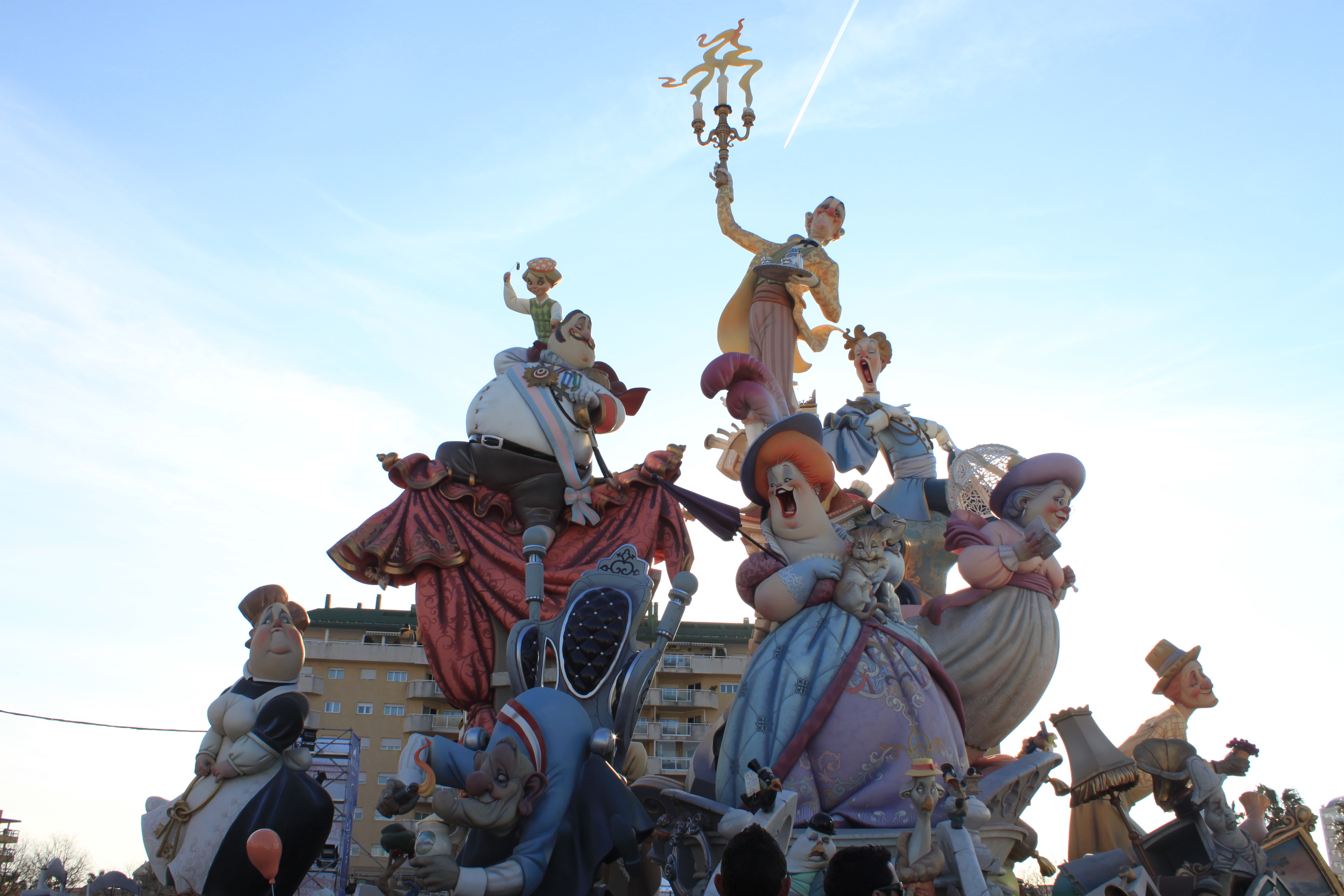
2012: Nou Campanar

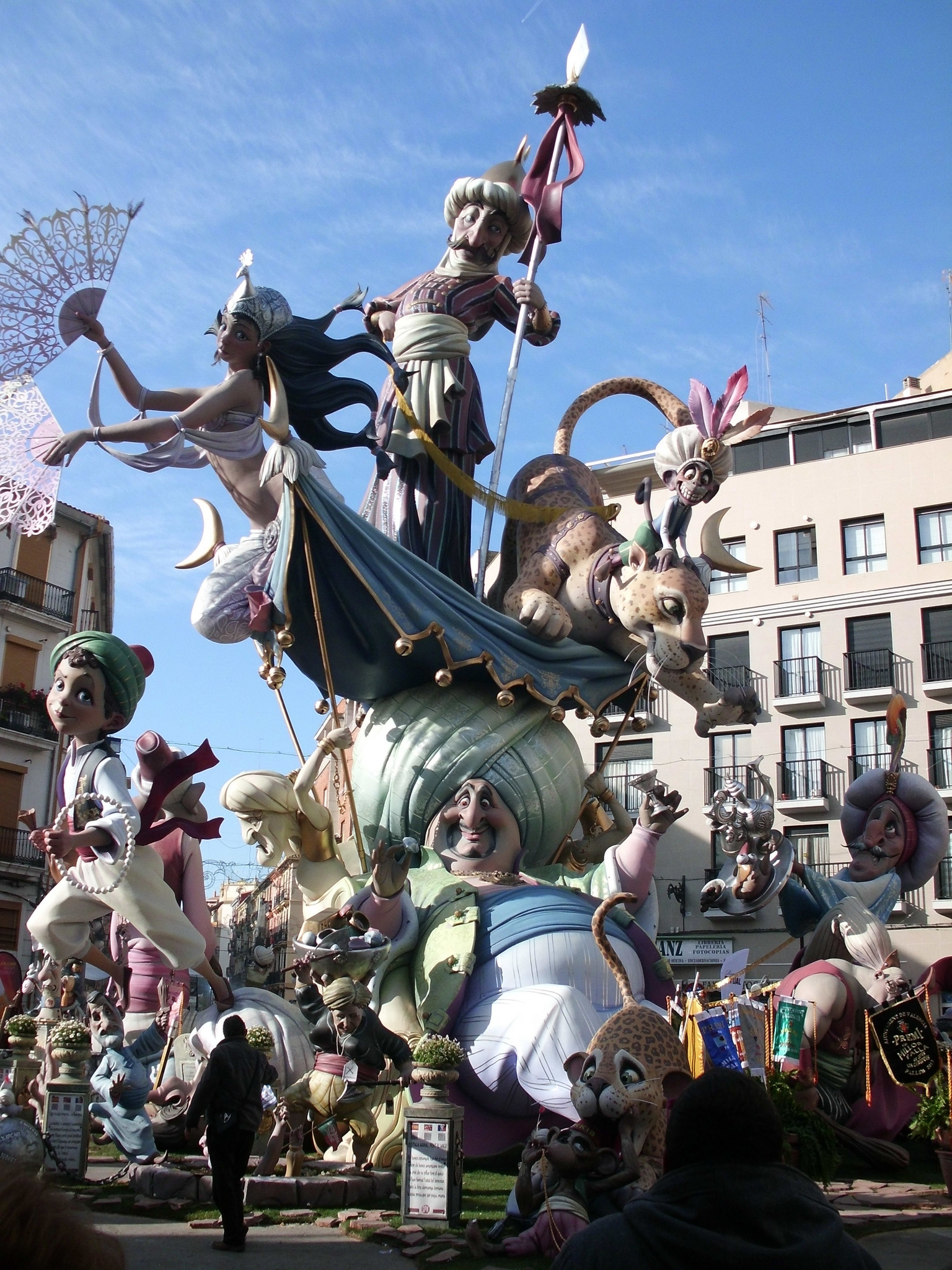
2013: Convent Jerusalem-Matemàtic Marzal

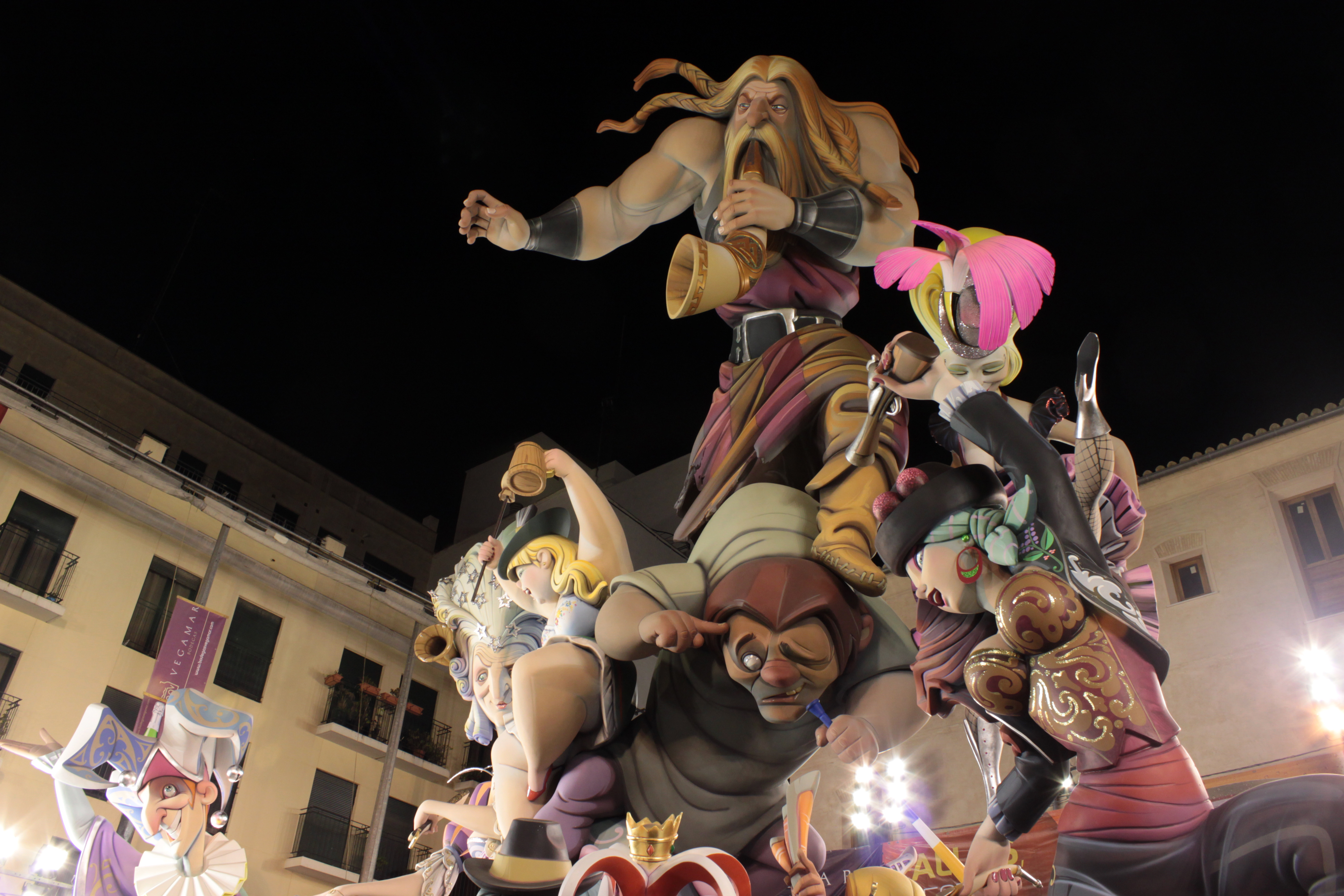
2014: Plaza del Pilar

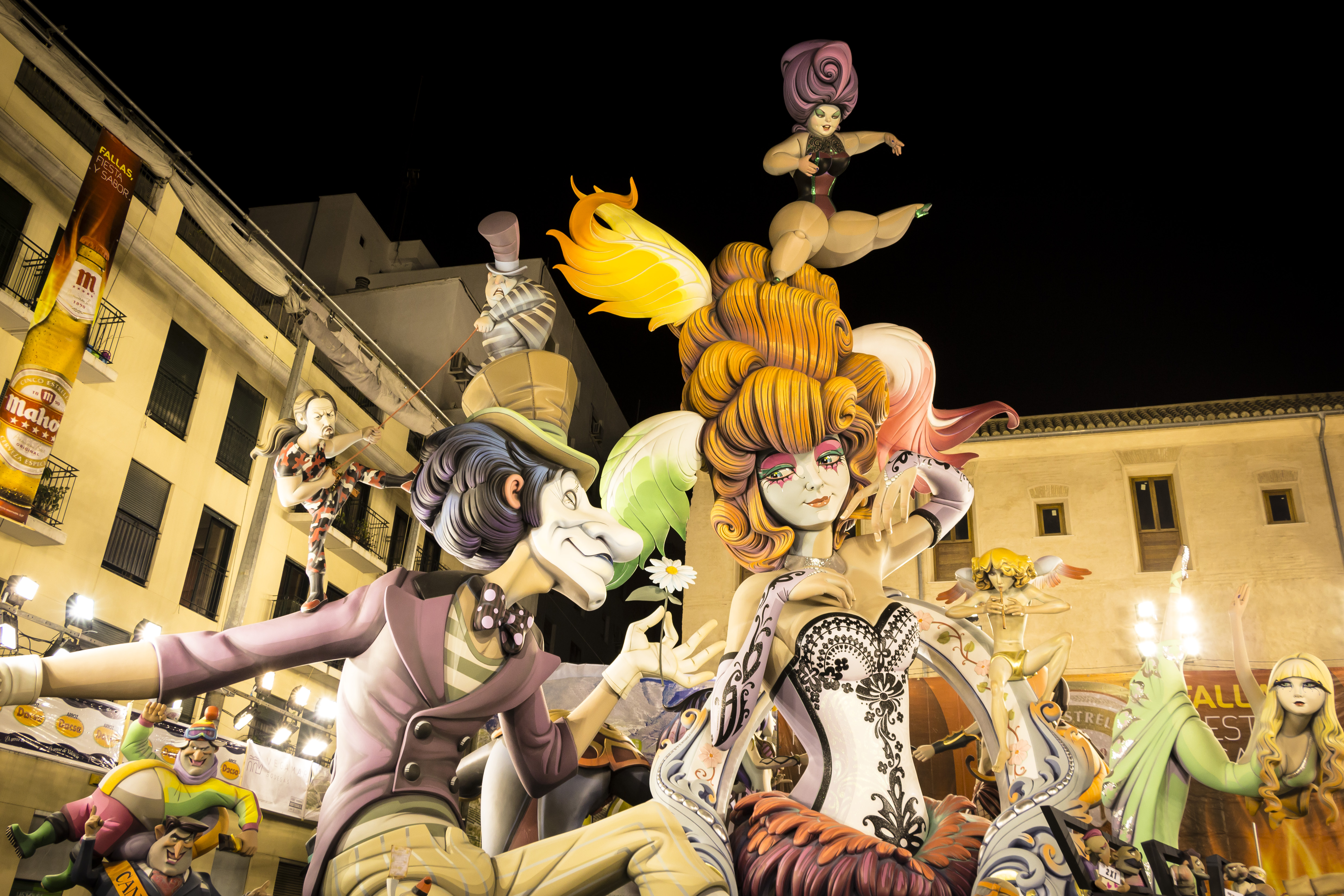
2015: Plaza del Pilar

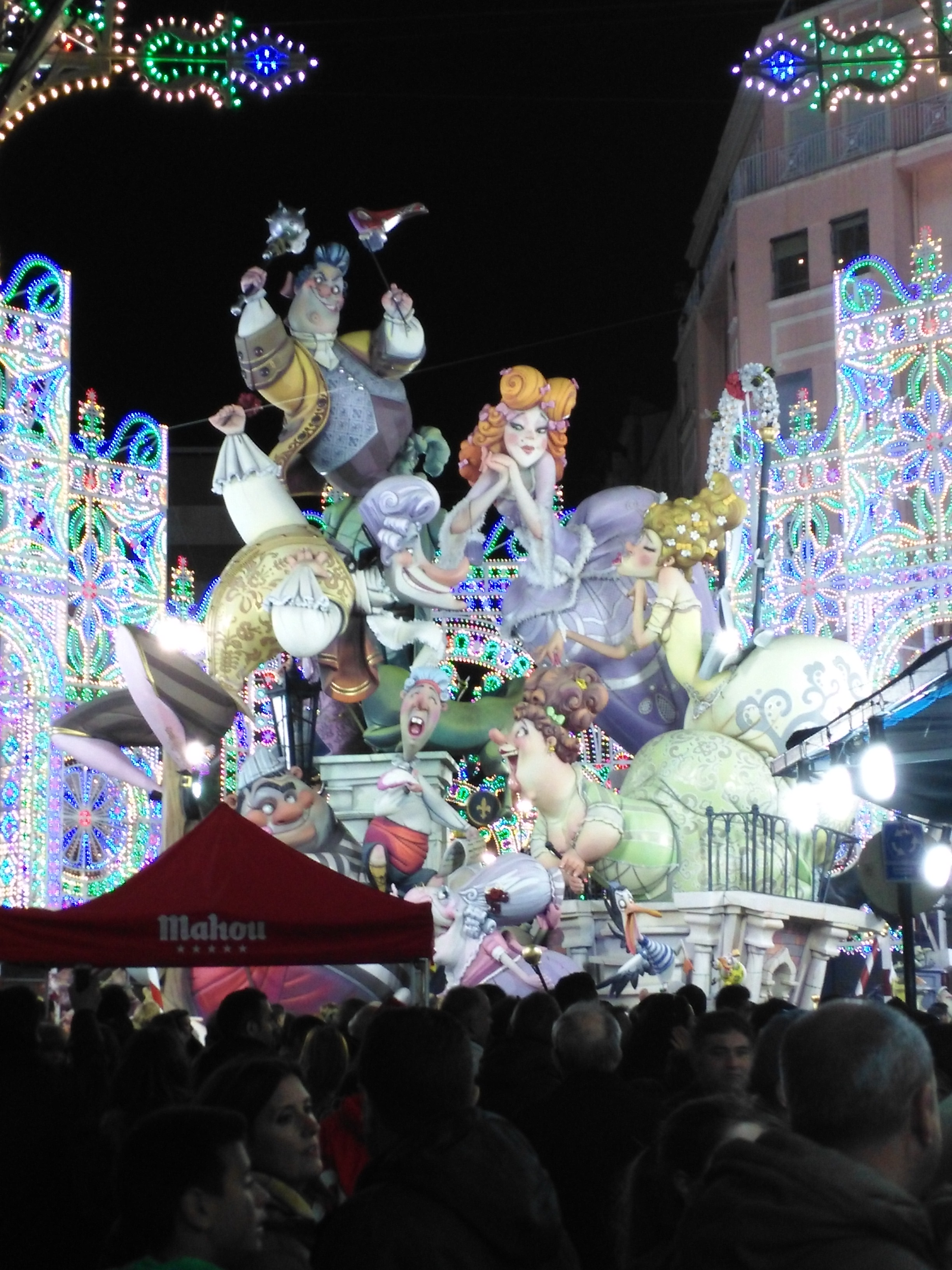
2016: Cuba-Literato Azorín

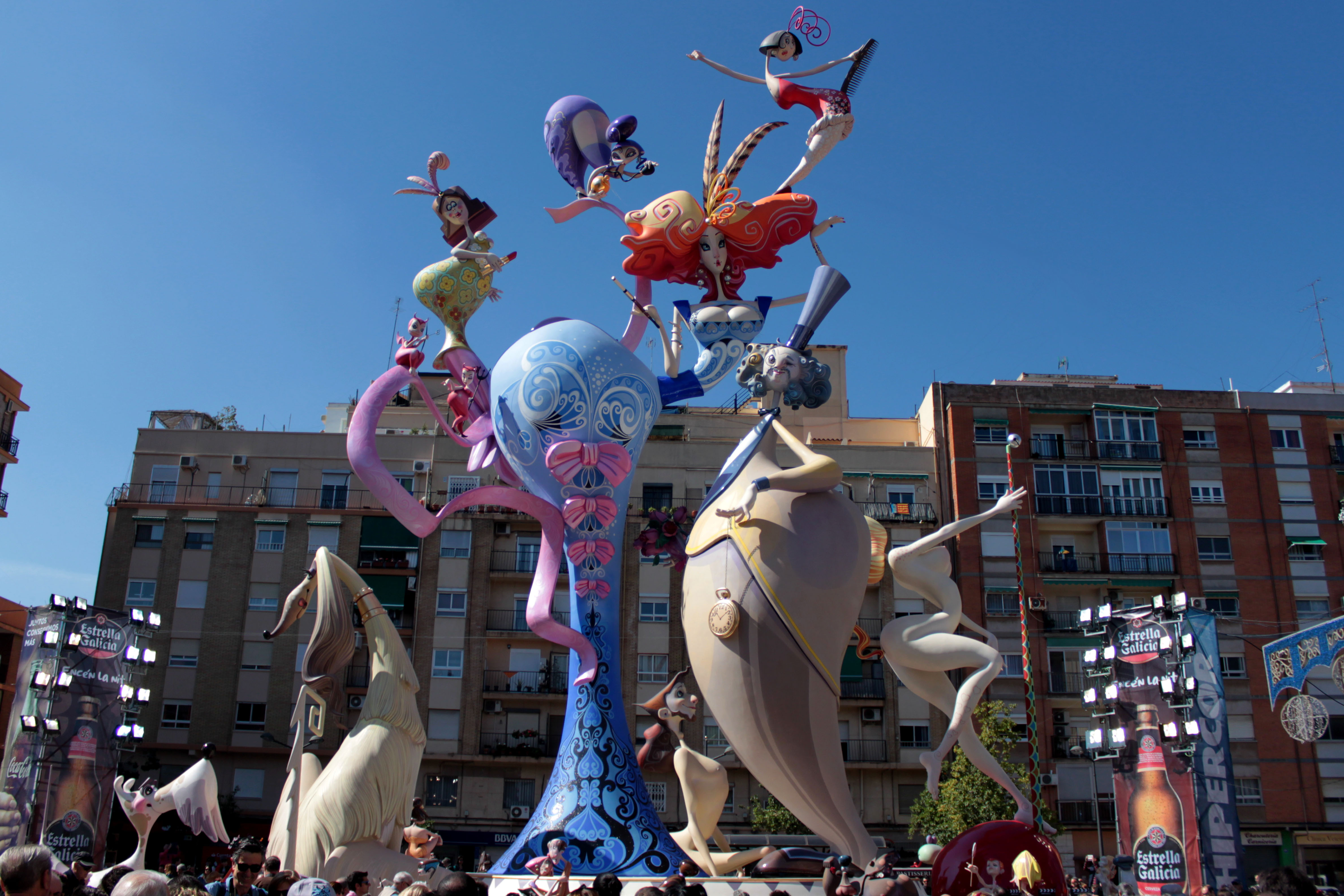
2017: L'Antiga de Campanar

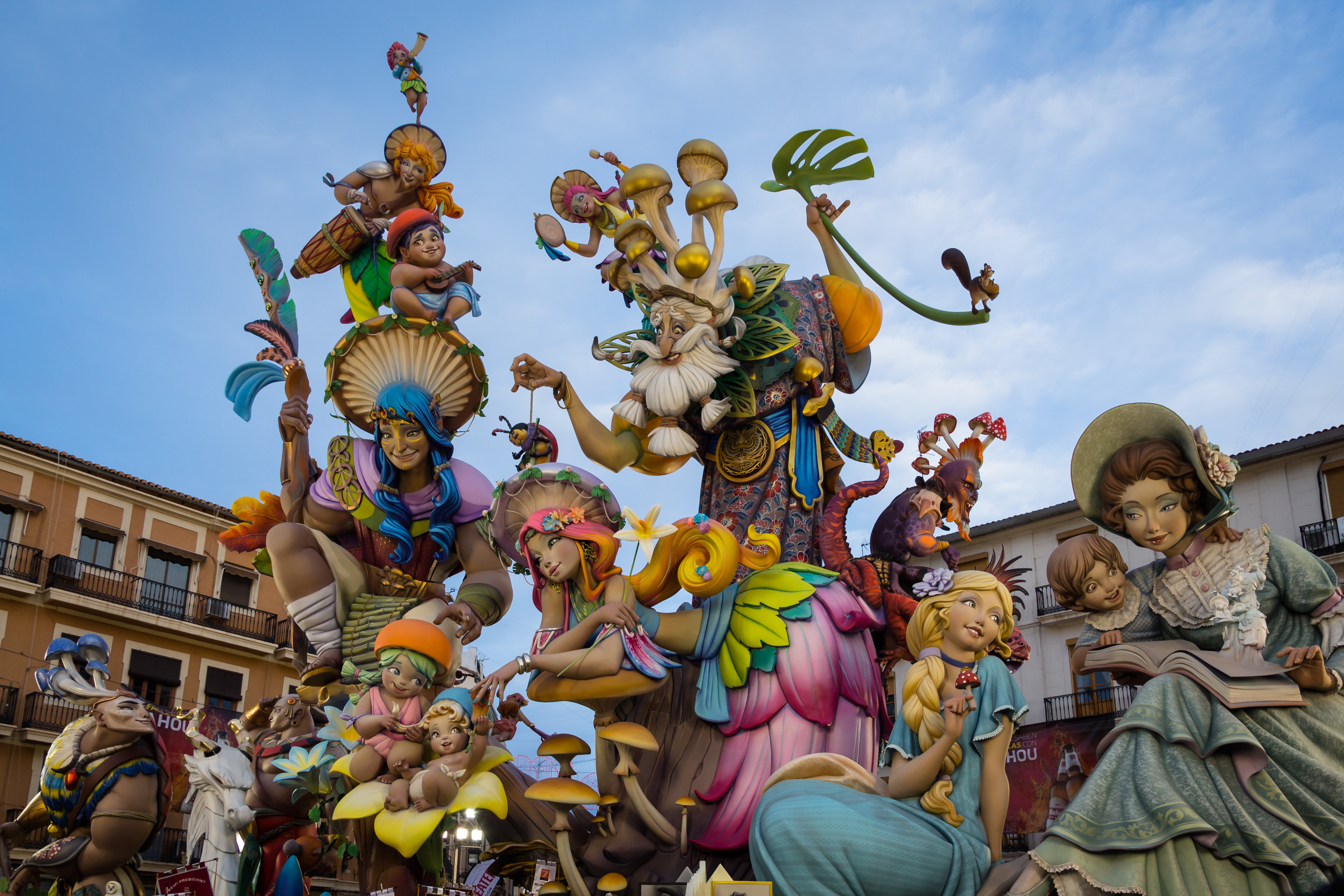
2018: Convent Jerusalem-Matemàtic Marzal

== See also ==
- List of Winners of Sección Especial of Falles

== Fallas gallery ==
2005

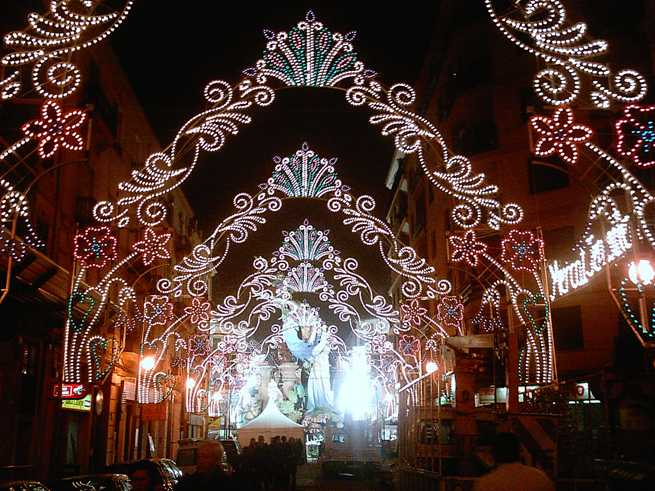
View down street

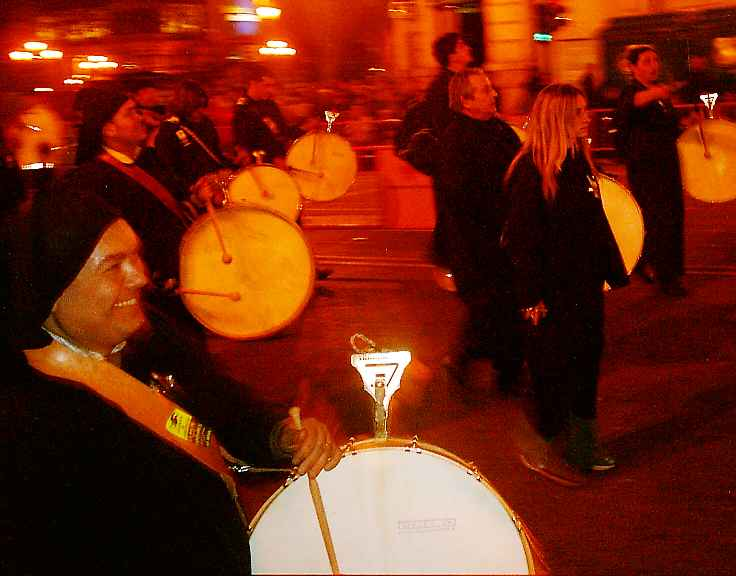
Falleres and fallers merrily beating drums

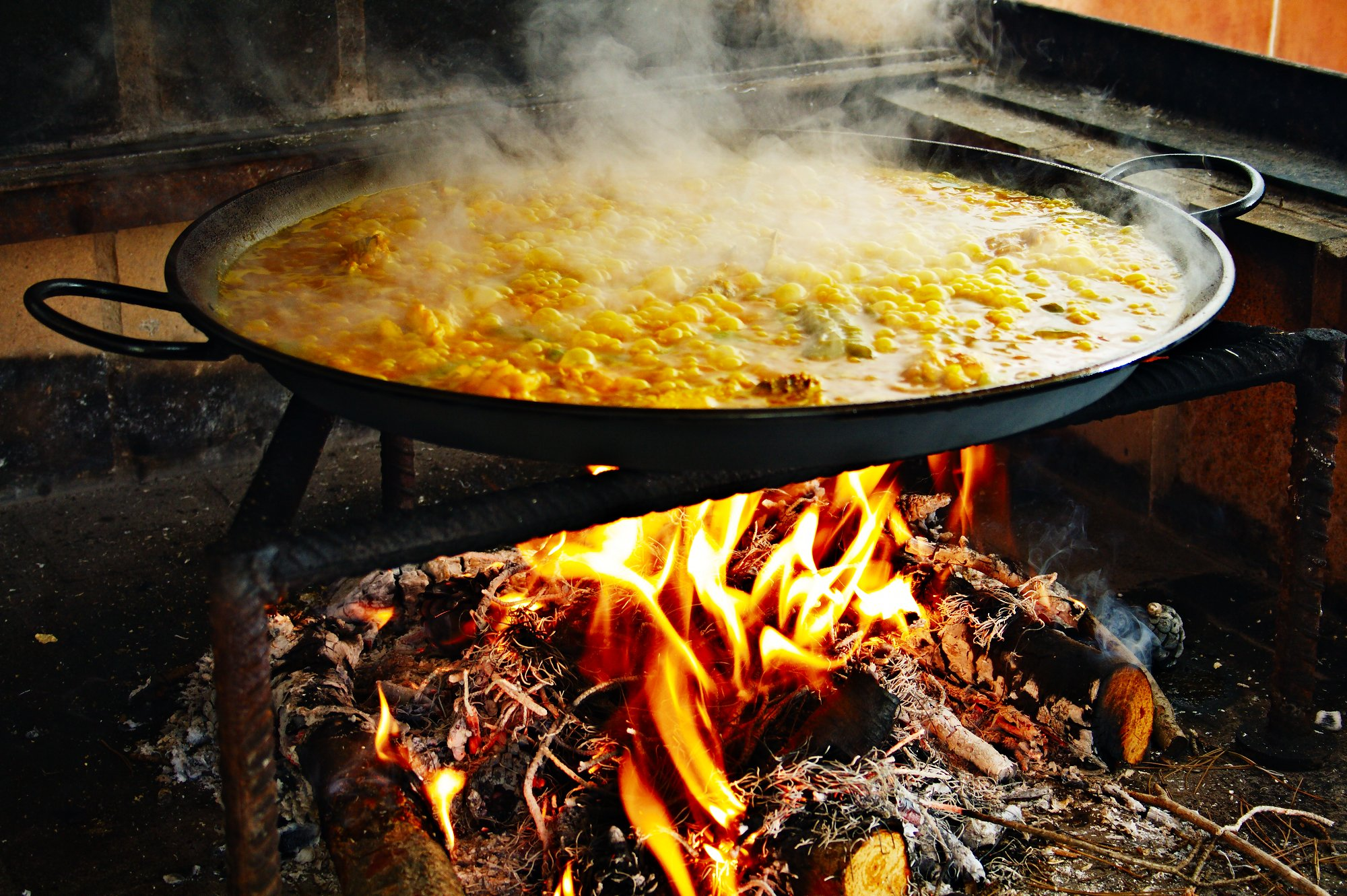
Paella being cooked on a wood fire in the middle of the road

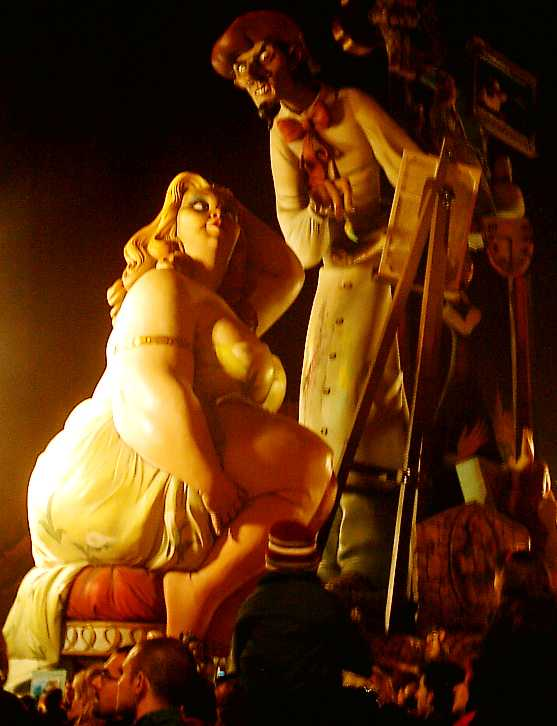
Falla with painter and fat woman. This was as high as a building.

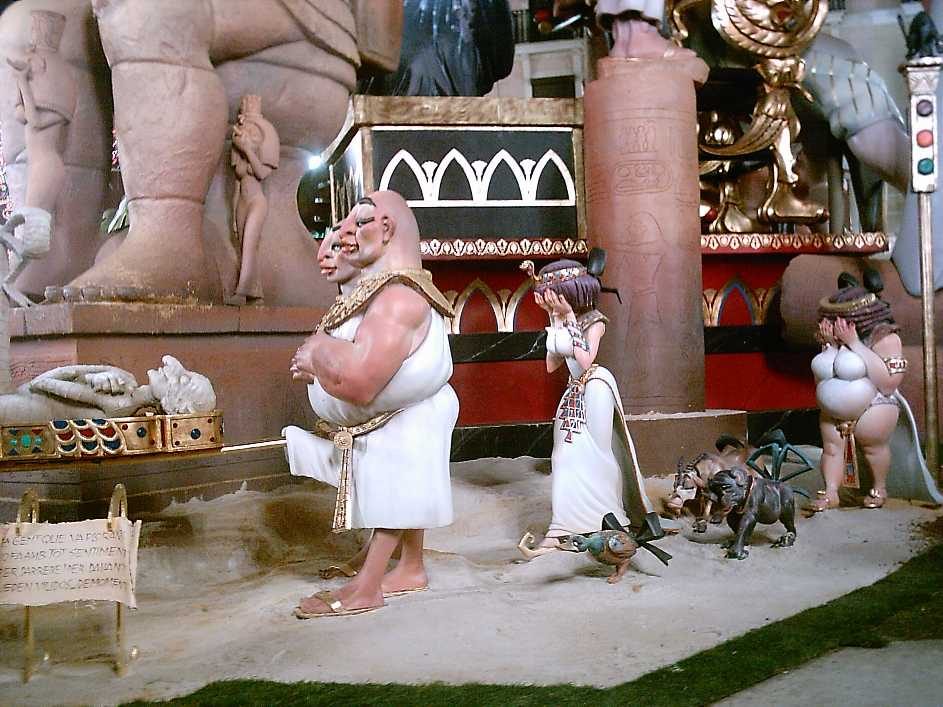
Part of falla with Egyptian funeral procession. In Carrer del Convent de Jerusalem. 2nd prize, special section, Falles 2005.

2008

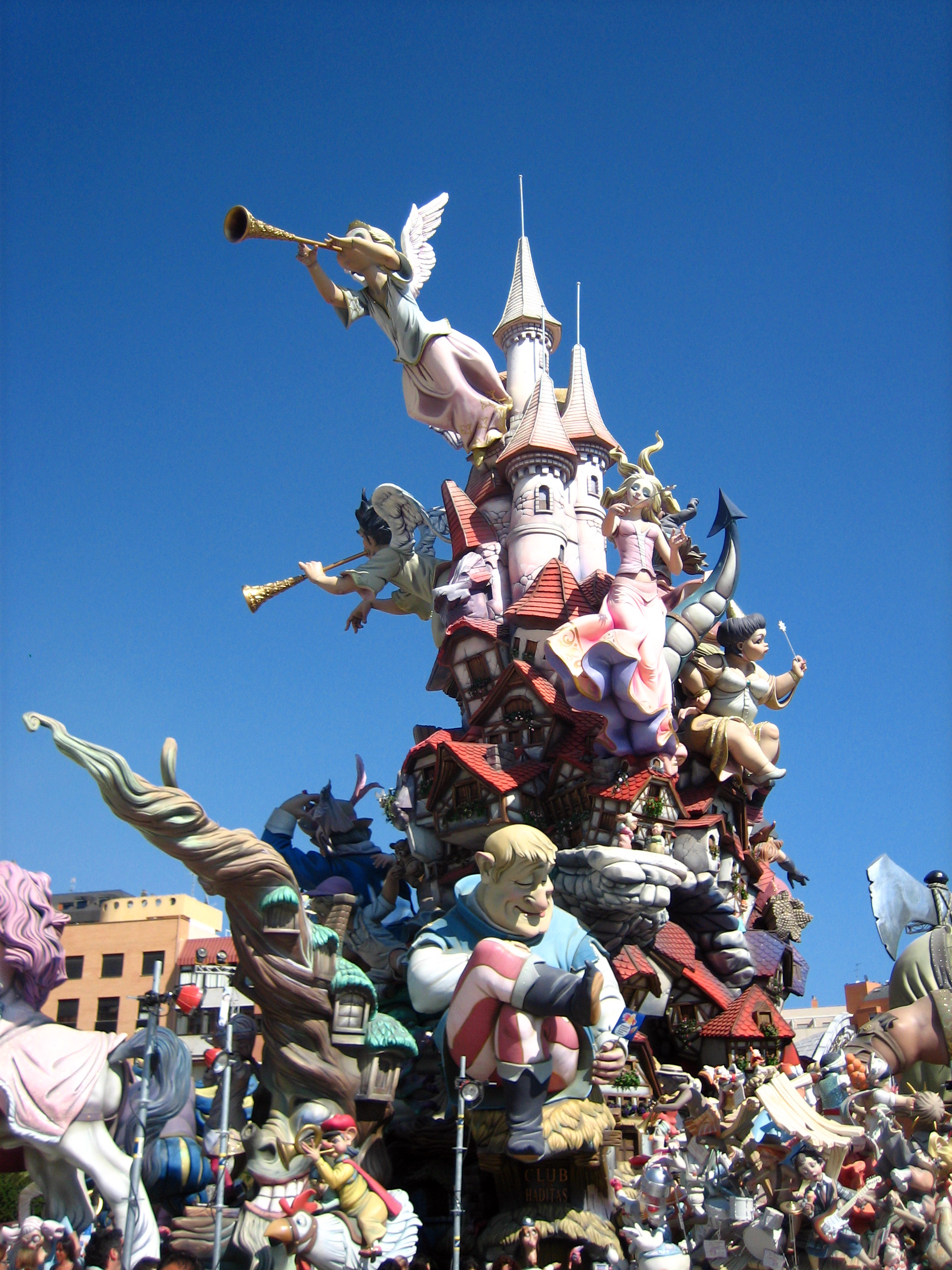
Falla in Nou Campanar

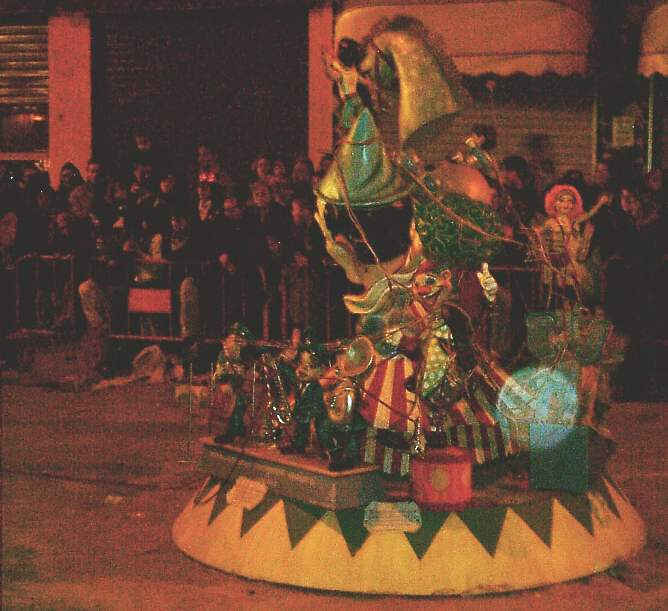
The children's falla in carrer Poeta Altet

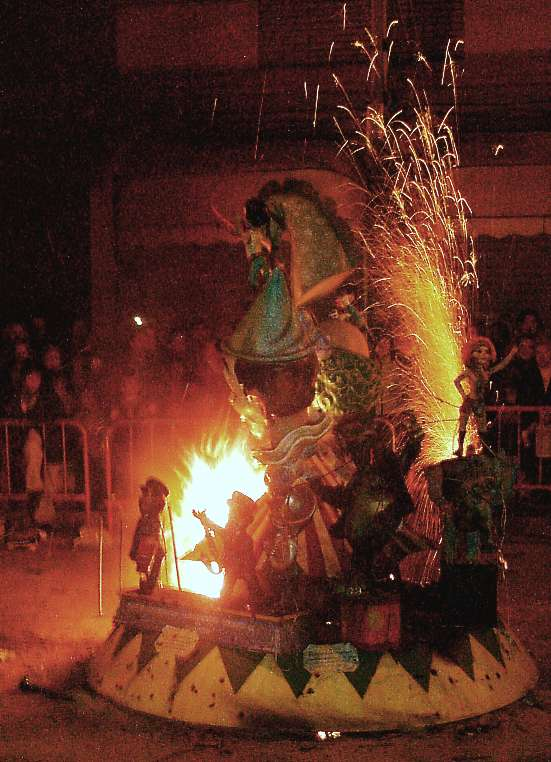
The same falla with fireworks going off

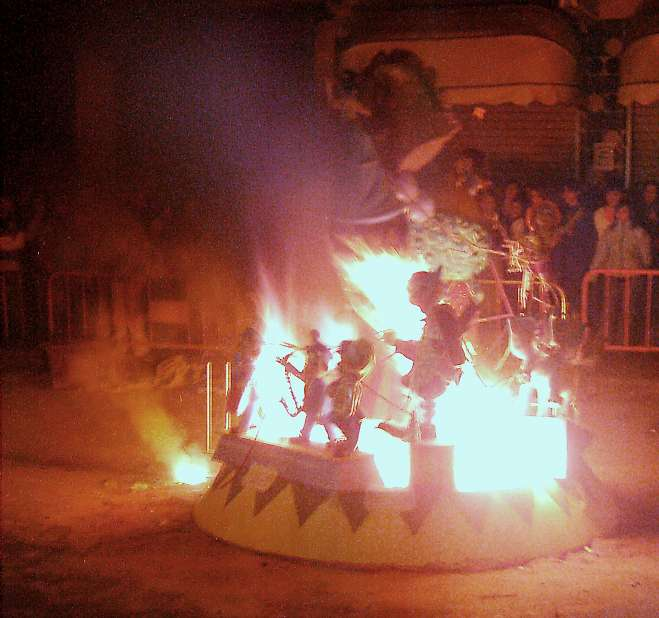
The same falla blazing

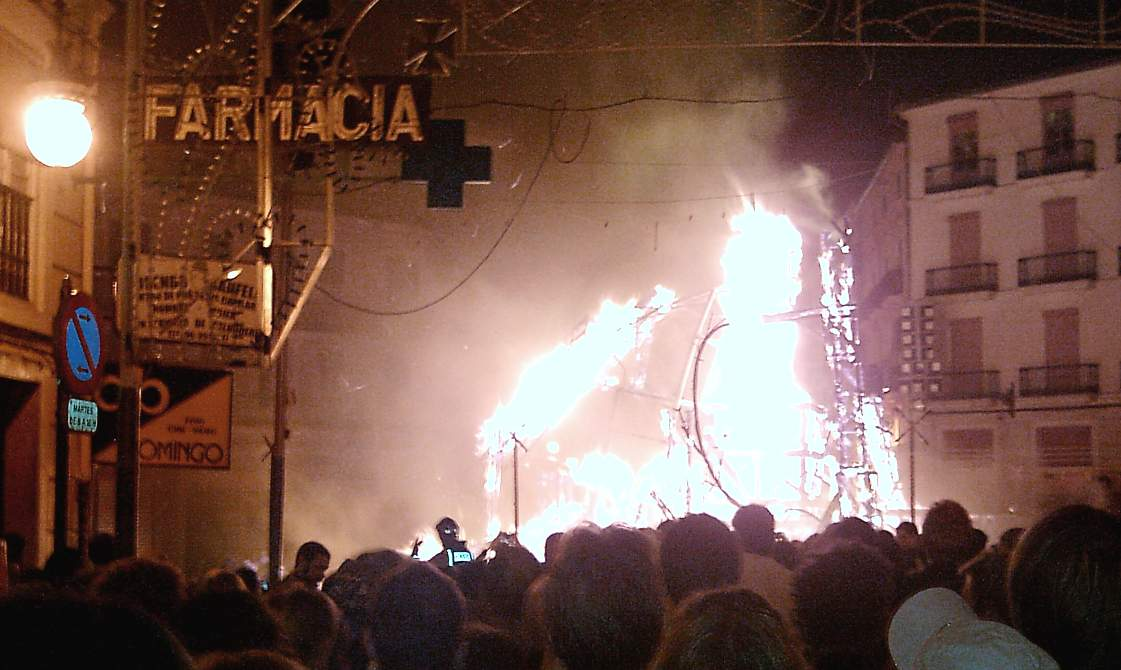
The monumental Egyptian falla, just as the frame of its tallest tower collapses

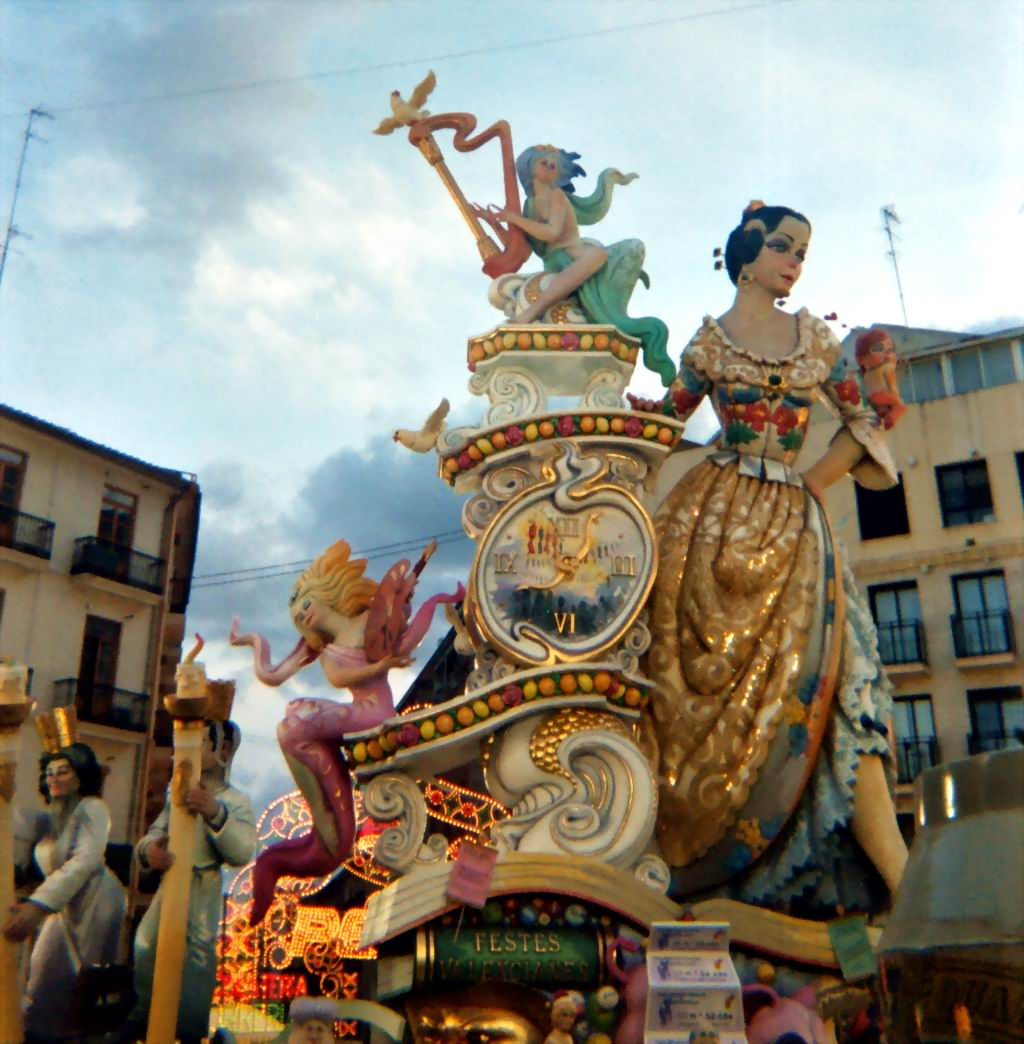
Falla in the Convento de Jerusalén Street

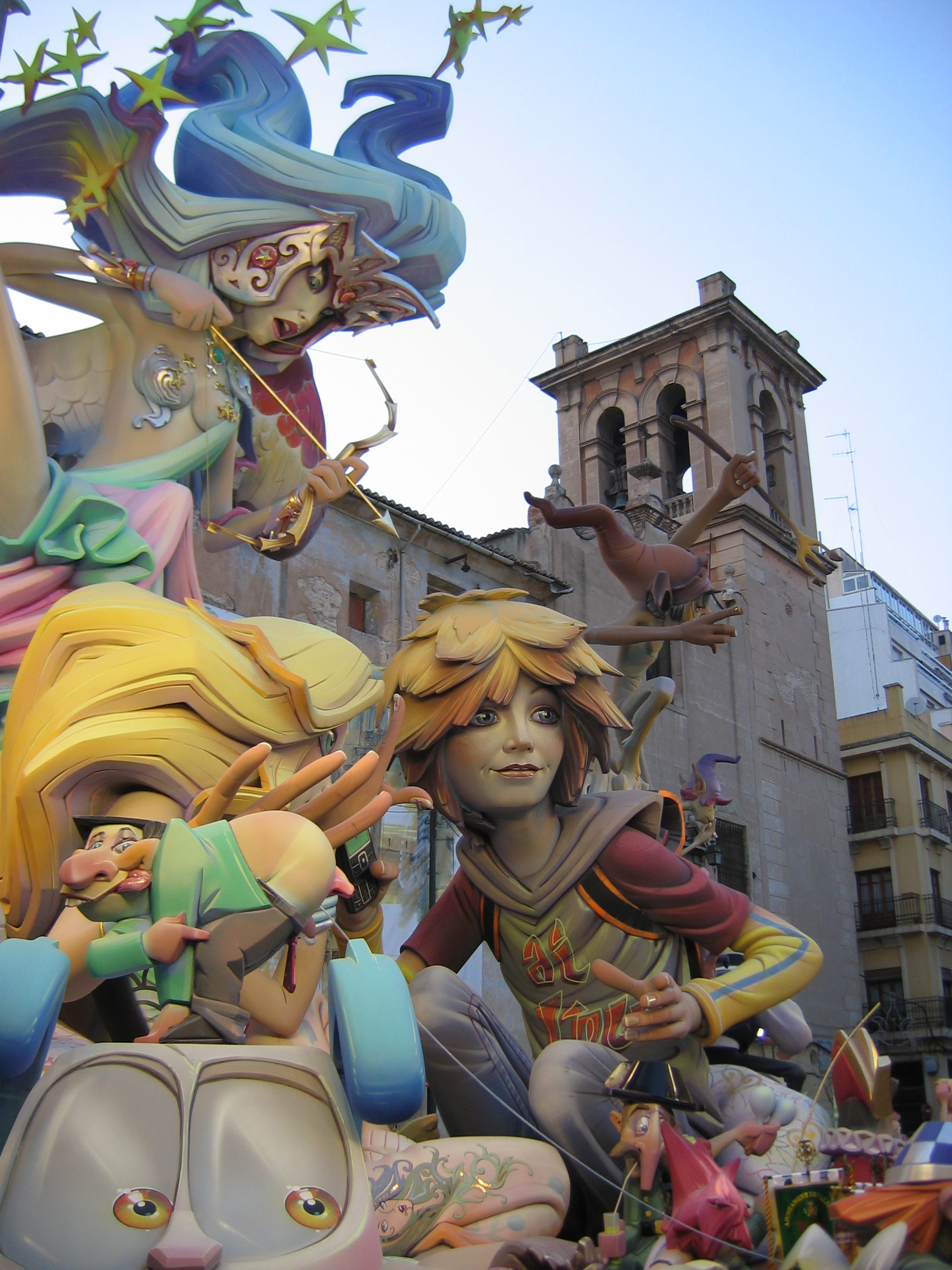
Falla in the Pilar's Square

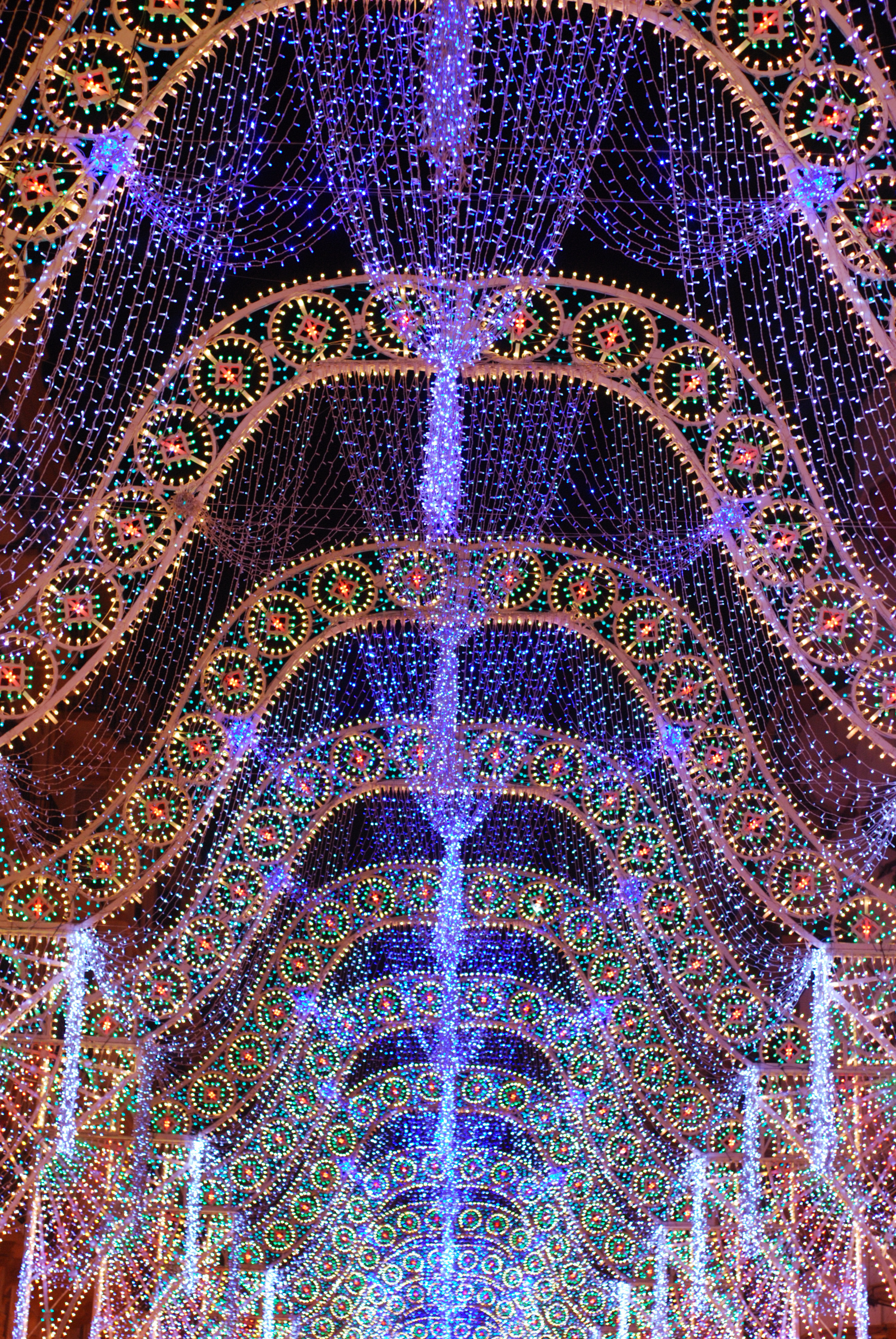
Twilight street of Sueca-Literato Azorín

2010

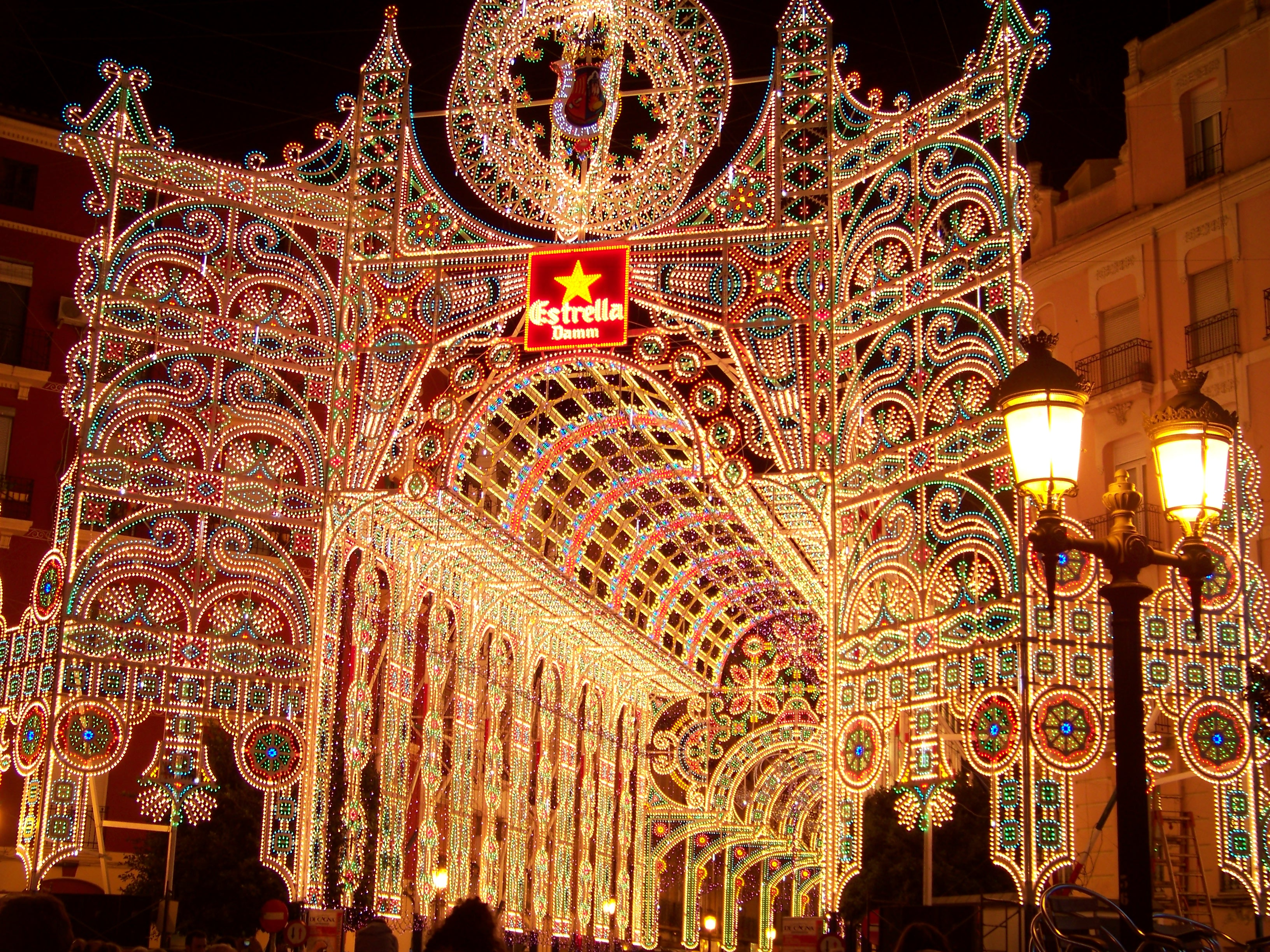
Falla Literato Azorín lightning

2017

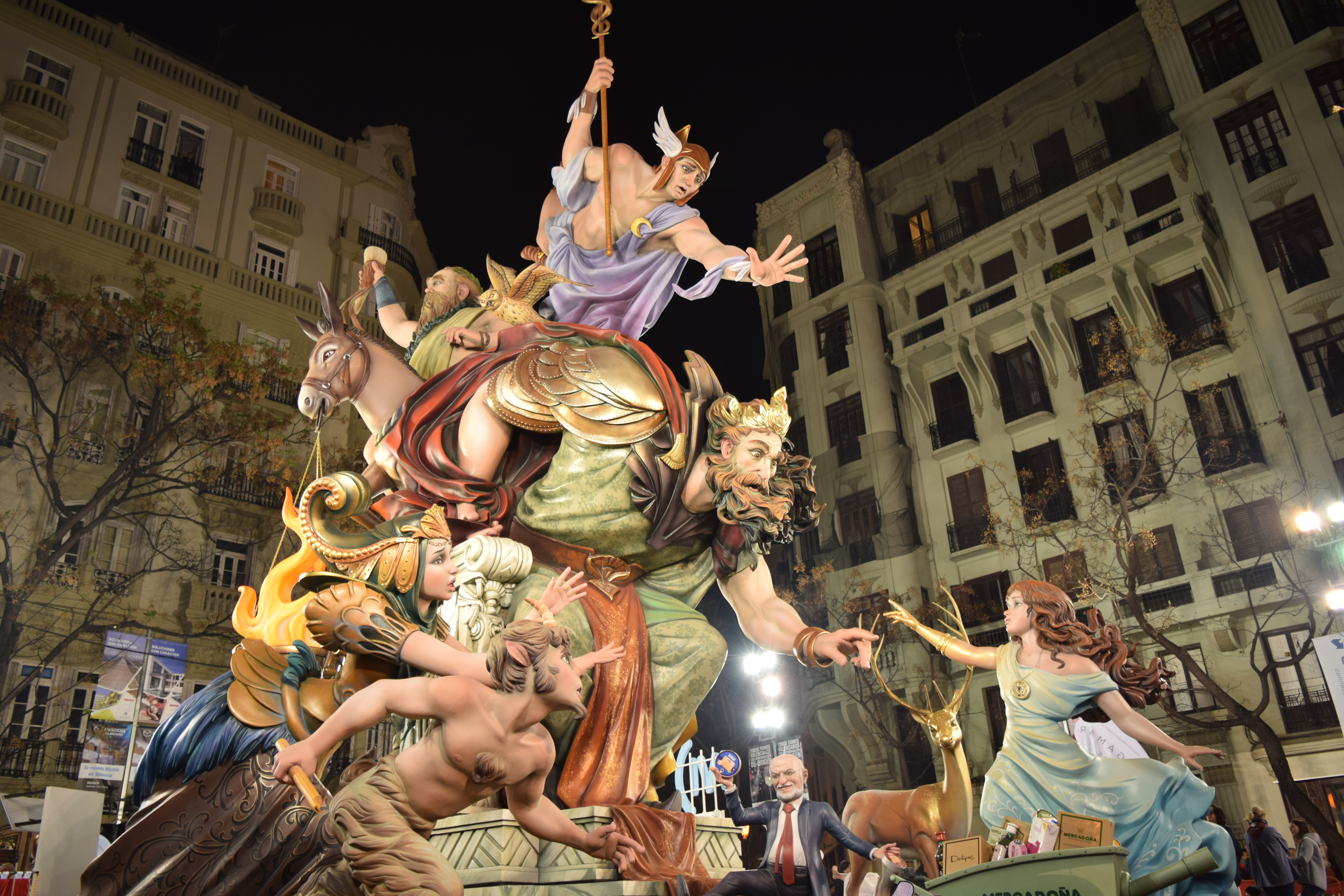
Falla Almirante Cadarso-Conde Altea (5th prize)

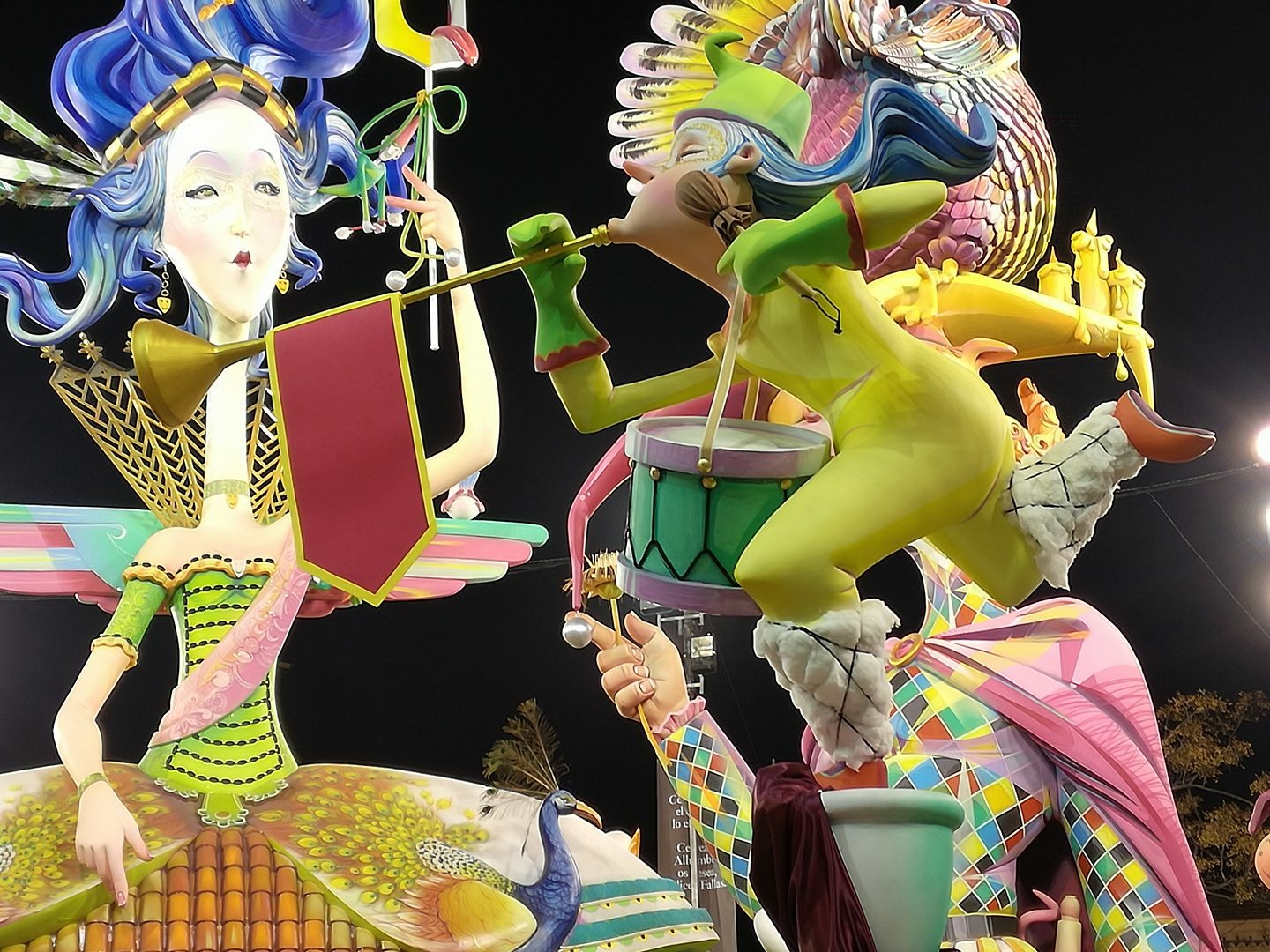
Falla Na Jordana (7th prize)

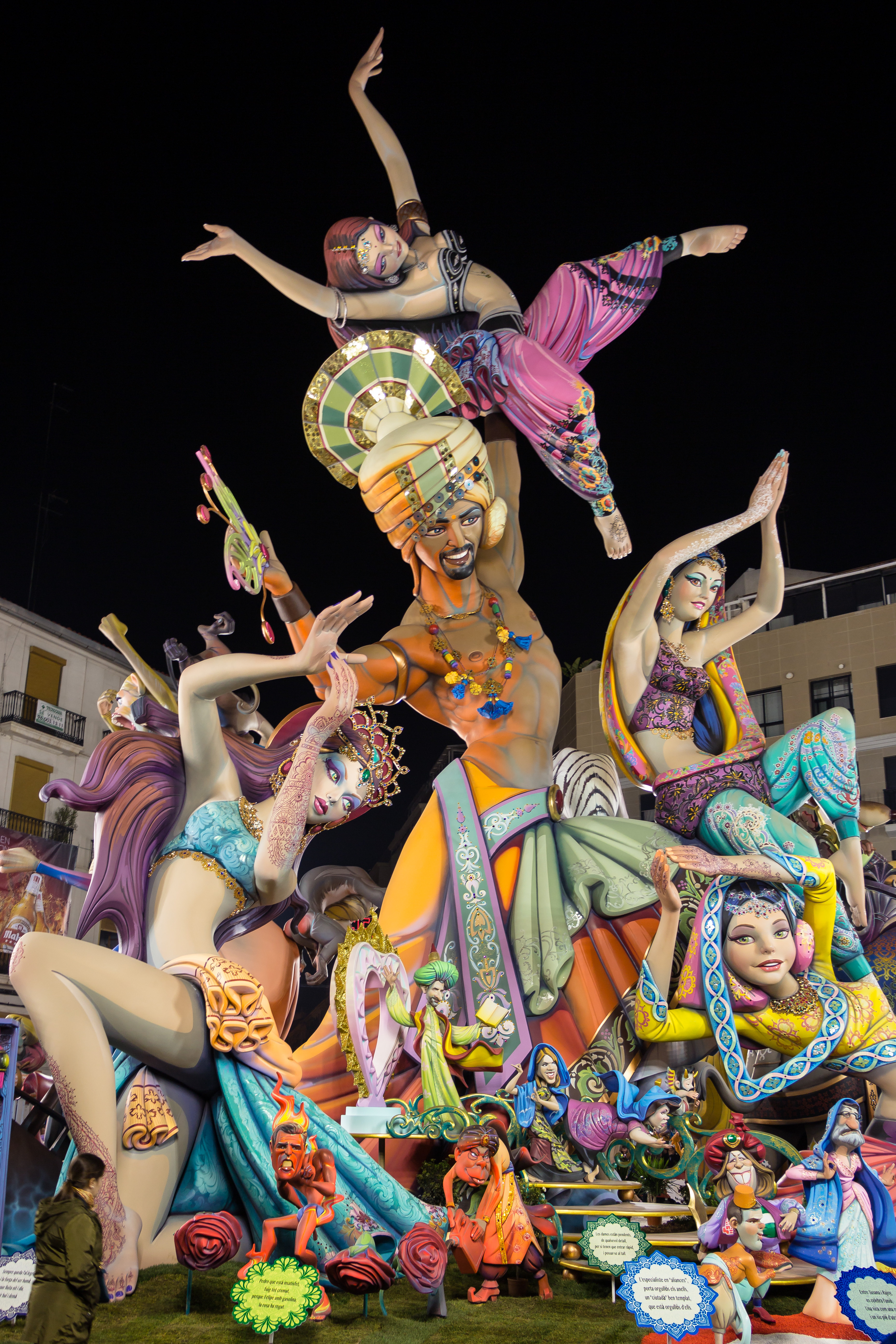
Falla Convento Jerusalen Matematico Marzal (3rd prize)
