= Magdalena Festival =

Festival in Castellón de la Plana, Spain

Magdalena Festival Fira i Festes de la Magdalena
- Dates: February–March–April (depending on the year)
- Begins: The third Saturday of Lent
- Ends: Eight days after the start of the festival
- Frequency: Annual
- Location(s): Castellón de la Plana, Spain

Fiesta of International Tourist Interest
- Designated: 2010

The Magdalena Festival is the main festivity of Castellón de la Plana, the capital city of the province of Castelló, in the Valencian Community, Spain. It commemorates the origins of the city, recalling the move of the city from the Hill of Mary Magdalene to the fertile coastal plain in 1251.

This festival lasts for 9 days. It starts on the third Saturday of Lent and it was declared a Fiesta of International Tourist Interest in 2010.

== The semana festera ==
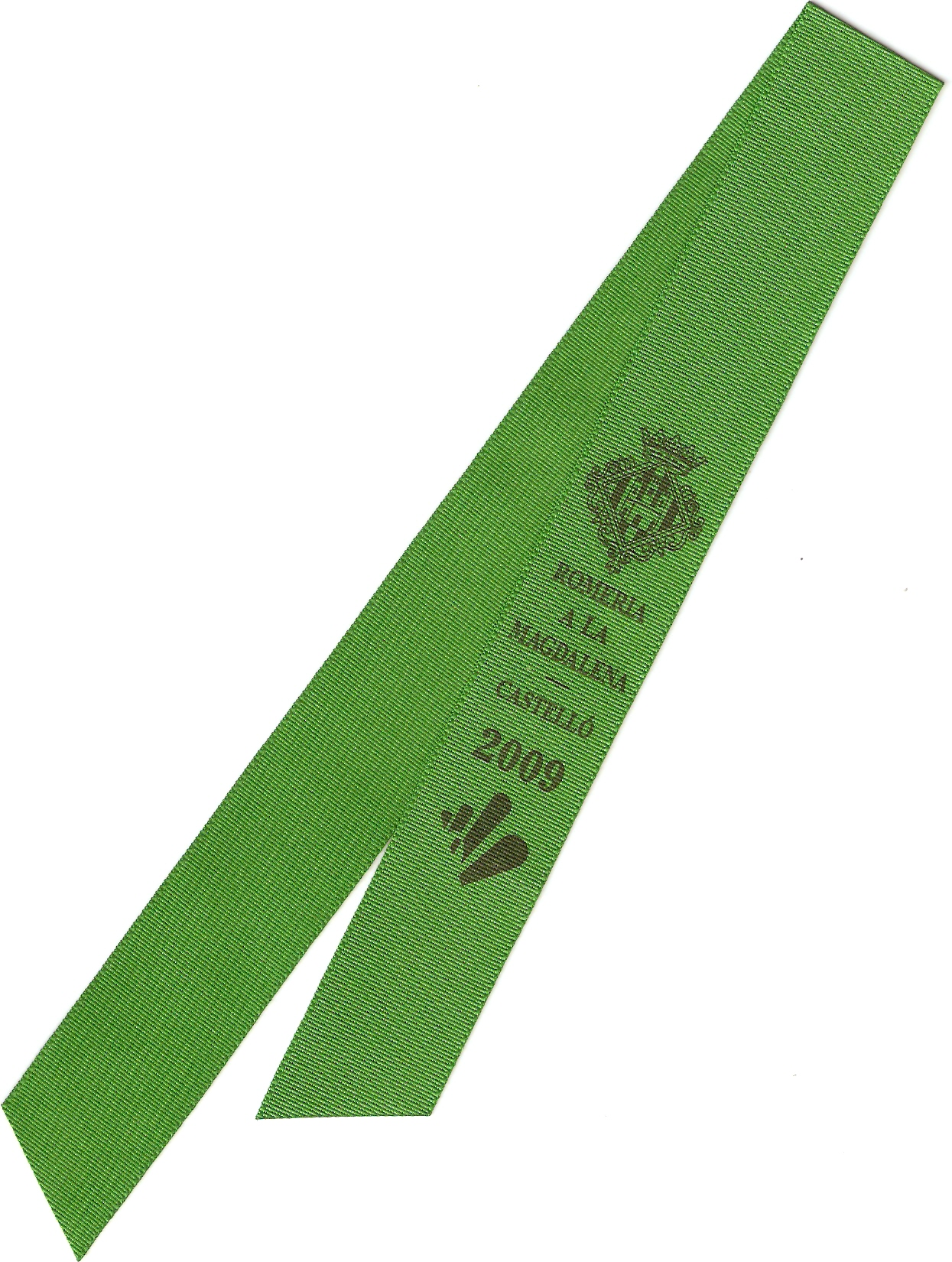
Typical ribbon used as a symbol of the Festivity

=== Dates of the festival ===
- 2015: from 7 to 15 March.

Next celebrations

- 2016: from 27 February to 7 March.
- 2017: from 18 to 26 March.
- 2018: from 3 to 11 March.
- 2019: from 23 March to 1 April.
- 2020: from 14 to 22 March.

The first day of the Magdalena Festival is the third Saturday of Lent.

Considering that the first day of Lent (since the First Council of Nicaea in 325) is the first Sunday after the full moon that occurs on or after the spring equinox, the dates of the Magdalena Festival between 1945 and 2050 are, according to the calculations of M. Armengot (using Gauss's law), as follows:

03/03/1945, 03/23/1946, 03/08/1947, 02/28/1948, 03/19/1949, 03/11/1950, 02/24/1951, 03/15/1952, 03/07/1953, 03/27/1954, 03/12/1955, 03/03/1956, 03/23/1957, 03/08/1958, 02/28/1959, 03/19/1960, 03/04/1961, 03/24/1962, 03/16/1963, 02/29/1964, 03/20/1965, 03/12/1966, 02/25/1967, 03/16/1968, 03/08/1969, 02/28/1970, 03/13/1971, 03/04/1972, 03/24/1973, 03/16/1974, 03/01/1975, 03/20/1976, 03/12/1977, 02/25/1978, 03/17/1979, 03/08/1980, 03/28/1981, 03/13/1982, 03/05/1983, 03/24/1984, 03/09/1985, 03/01/1986, 03/21/1987, 03/05/1988, 02/25/1989, 03/17/1990, 03/02/1991, 03/21/1992, 03/13/1993, 03/05/1994, 03/18/1995, 03/09/1996, 03/01/1997, 03/14/1998, 03/06/1999, 03/25/2000, 03/17/2001, 03/02/2002, 03/22/2003, 03/13/2004, 02/26/2005, 03/18/2006, 03/10/2007, 02/23/2008, 03/14/2009, 03/06/2010, 03/26/2011, 03/10/2012, 03/02/2013, 03/22/2014, 03/07/2015, 02/27/2016, 03/18/2017, 03/03/2018, 03/23/2019, 03/14/2020, 03/06/2021, 03/19/2022, 03/11/2023, 03/02/2024, 03/22/2025, 03/07/2026, 02/27/2027, 03/18/2028, 03/03/2029, 03/23/2030, 03/15/2031, 02/28/2032, 03/19/2033, 03/11/2034, 02/24/2035, 03/15/2036, 03/07/2037, 03/27/2038, 03/12/2039, 03/03/2040, 03/23/2041, 03/08/2042, 02/28/2043, 03/19/2044, 03/11/2045, 02/24/2046, 03/16/2047, 03/07/2048, 03/27/2049, 03/12/2050.

It should be highlighted that, since the first celebration of the Magdalena Festival in 1945, the year with the earliest date of the festivities was in 2008, from 23 February to 2 March; whilst the celebration which began on the latest date was in 1981, from 28 March to 5 April.

In both 1948 and 2032, the most important day of the festival, the Sunday of the Magdalena Festival (third Sunday of Lent and first Sunday of the week of celebrations), is 29 February; the coincidence of the events on 29 February in each respective century.

=== Saturday: De la festa, la vespra - Day of Castellon Province ===
The opening day of the festival is dedicated to the province of Castellon and its people.

==== Official announcement of the festival ====
The festivities begin at 12:00 noon, when commemorative fireworks are set off; the number of fireworks reflects the number of years that have passed since the celebration of the festival. This is followed by a mascletà, a very loud coordinated firecracker display, which is prepared by the winners of the previous year's pyrotechnic competition and takes place in Plaza del Primer Molí; it lasts between 10 and 15 minutes.

==== Floral tribute to the monument of King James I of Aragon ====
Alongside the fireworks is a special wreath and flower laying ceremony that the Festival Queen attends on the monument to King James I, regarded as the grandfather of the city and the one who gave the order for its foundation in 1251.

==== Official opening parade ====
A traditional, vernacular parade reflecting the mythology, history, customs and folklore of Castellón.

This parade starts at 4:00 p.m. and lasts for approximately 4 hours, passing through central and northern parts of the city. The following sections can be distinguished:

- Mythology of Castellón. The Colla del Rei Barbut performs the mythology of Castellón.
- History of Castellón. Participants dress up as members of groups of people that left their mark on Castellón: the Moors (Asociación cultural Moros d´Alqueria), the Christians (Cavallers de la Conquesta y Templarios), the Jews (Asociación Cultural Aljama) and the pirates (Colla Bacalao).
- Towns of the province. Most of the towns of the province take part at this point of the parade.
- City of Castellón. This section focuses on the folklore and customs of the city; the coast, the plains, the mountains and the city proper. Some parts of this section makes reference to elements of the festival itself:
  - Pikes of the city: Two castelloneros holding long stick decorated with red and yellow carnations and Castellón's coat of arms.
  - Sector commissions. Each of the 19 major gaiata sector commissions (groups organising a gaiata display) takes part in this part of the procession. Each commission is made up of a standard bearer, the "ladies and their gentlemen" and of the "maid of honour", on the arm of the first vicepresident, of the respective gaiata sector commission.
  - The Virgin's basket: a large basket containing red and yellow carnations held by the presidents of the gaiatas, who present them to the Blessed Virgin Mary during the offering.
  - Bugles of the city: four musicians riding on horseback before the town crier, playing the City March.
  - Local festival opening speech: the most important element of the procession; the town crier sings the verses written for this event by Bernat Artola. After they have been sung before the gallery of dignitaries, the festival begins.
  - A Carriage with the maids of honour, the ladies of the city and the queen of the festival: traditionally two oxen-drawn carriages - today pulled by a tractor - linked together, on which the maids of honour of each of the gaiatas, the ladies of the city, and the queen of the festival sit.
  - The Castellón City Band closes the parade playing marches and pasadobles.

After the opening speech (pregó) ends, the Enfarolà del Campanar begins. It is a display which consists of illuminating el Fadrí, the tower in the centre of Castellón, with a pyrotechnic display.

=== Sunday: "Magdalena festa plena" ===
The most important day of the Magdalena Festival.

==== Pilgrimage of the canes ====
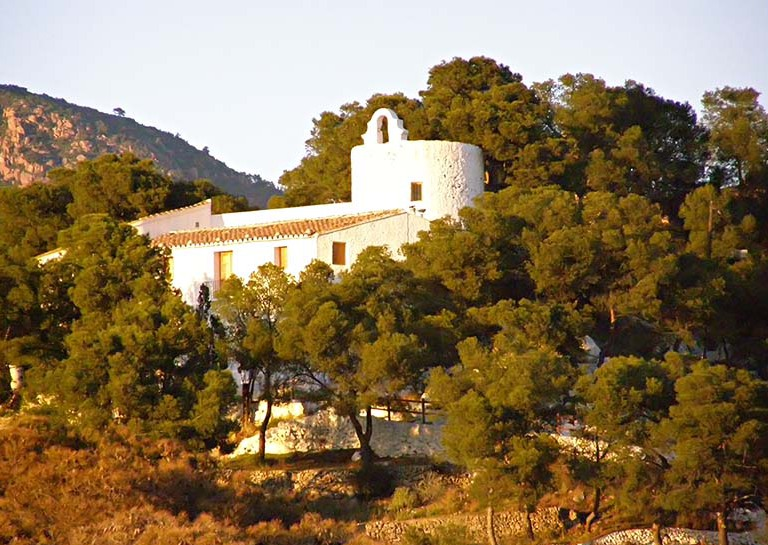
Mary Magdalene Chapel

Festival Sunday starts with the ringing of the "Vicent" bell at 5:30 am at El Fadri, and Masses are held in the Minor Basilica and other churches to pray for the safety of the pilgrimage party as it leaves the city proper. As mentioned in the opening verses of the pregó (an announcement made by a town crier) on Saturday, the bell's chime means "Ja el día es arribat de la nostra Magdalena" ("The day of our Magdalena celebration has come").

At 8:00 am, the pilgrimage - so called because of the canes carried by those taking part, a reminder of the city's past - starts from the Plaza Mayor (Castellón) (Main Square). Although its official starting point is the Plaza Mayor, most pilgrims start from Plaza María Agustina (María Agustina Square), which is a typical meeting place and through which the main route passes, with the main dignitaries wearing traditional attire. From there, the pilgrimage goes through several streets of the north side of the city and it continues, along rural paths, until it reaches the Mary Magdalene chapel. Halfway there, one of the compulsory stops (according to tradition) is Sant Roc de Canet chapel, where people have a mid-morning snack, for example the typical "figa i doset", and where pilgrims say a prayer.

After this long walk, people arrive at the Mary Magdelene Chapel while there has been an advance party that has arrived there by cars or bicycles, as their occupants disembark for the walk to the hill, as well as those who disembarked from RENFE trains to attend the celebration. As bells ring, a mascletá (a series of pyrotechnic explosions) is set off to announce the arrival of the pilgrims, who are handed "rotllos" (ring-shaped pretzels). Then, following High Mass said at the chapel to mark the feast of the city, everyone tries a little of an enormous paella which is served following the service to all attending for lunch.

Alongside Mass, the pilgrimage party and tourists alike also take the chance to visit the ruins of the Castle of Fadrell nearby.

==== La tornà de la romeria (the return from the pilgrimage) and the Procession of Penitents ====
The so-called tornà de la romería had disappeared for some years, but it was recently started again by the Colla El Pixaví. It begins at 3:45 pm at the Mary Magdalene Chapel and stops at every chapel and religious building on the way. The arrival at the Basilica of Our Lady of Lledó is especially emotional, as this is the place where some people pray and where pilgrims sing the Hail Mary. It is also the place where the dignitaries going to the Mary Magdalene Chapel and the pilgrims coming back from it meet.

At 7:00 pm the pilgrims arrive back in the city, preceded by the carros (motor-driven house-like constructions on wheels) which participate in the pilgrimage. They are followed by little traditional gaiatas, els Cavallers and the dignitaries, who walk in procession as far as the Plaza Mayor, together with the festival court and the city band. Next comes the "Penitents' Procession", which is traditionally the first procession of Holy Week in Spain.

A High Mass is held at the Basilica to mark the formal return of the pilgrimage group back to Castellon proper.

==== Gaiatas Parade ====
The Gaiatas Parade is part of la tornà de la romería. It allows residents of the city and tourists alike, as well as residents of the province, to show off the nineteen different gaiatas of the city (two each per district, the main gaiata and the children's gaiata of the sector), accompanied by the president, matron and members of the respective sector commission. In addition, two more gaiatas are shown: one sponsored by a well-known savings bank that maintains the tradition of les xiquetes del meneo, and the other the two gaiatas of the city, which represents the whole city and were the ones chosen as the best gaiatas in the previous year's gaiatas competition. All in all 41 floats are presented.

The Gaiata Parade passes through the city with the festival queens and their corresponding courts of honour, as well as a representation of the City Council and of the 'Corporació Municipal de Festes', the 'Junta de Festes de Castelló' and the City Band.

The only music which can be played at the parade is the classic Rotllo i Canya by concert bands. It starts after la tornà de la romeria. The members of the district "commissions" of gaiata infantil are followed by the members of the commission in charge of the main gaiata in the procession. One of the traditions of this act is les voltetes (the queen dances around her canya). People ask members of the commissions, traditionally girls and now boys only in the children's gaiata section, to do the volteta so that they show their dresses.

=== Festival Monday ===
The Monday following is marked as the Day of the Local Festival and among others the following are held on this day as described below.

==== Parade of Festooned Carriages and Children’s Parade ====
- With the participation of children, ancient scenes from Castellón are reenacted, and there is an exhibition for children and teens. As in the Saturday parade a young town crier, the Royal Court and the city band bring the rear of the parade. The carros from the Sunday festivities join in as well.

==== Lighting up of Gaiates ====
- All gaiatas are lit up at the same time for the public to admire them, and there is a competition in which the gaiata that receives the highest valuation from the jury is declared the winner of the event. Later, every gaiata returns to its own district and presides over the events organized by every commission. Traditionally the lighting up takes place through the Parque Ribalta. But exceptionally, in 2009 and 2010, it took place along the Av. Rei En Jaume due to roadworks. But, since 2012, the exhibition taken place in the Av. Rei En Jaume.

=== During the whole week ===
During the week, a multitude of celebrations are held, the most important of which appear in the following list:

- Mascletá, at 2:00 pm in Plaza del Primer Molí.
- Pyrotechnics Display, which starts about 11:00 pm at the area of Pau Gumbau, in the northeast of the city.
- Bullfighting at the bullring of Castellón.
- The Nit Màgica (the Magic Night): a fire display performed by the Xarxa Teatre company. Held On Tuesday after 11:00 pm.
- Children's fair: Entertainment for kids. Located in the showground.
- The Colorful High Street: a pitched battle of confetti, although flowers were used in the past, taking place on Thursday at 5:00 pm on Avenida del Rei. The main participants of this event are the members of the district commissions.
- The alternative fira: alternative fair from Thursday in the gardens of the Auditorium.
- Mesón del vino (the Wine Fair): located on Avenida Blasco Ibáñez, in the northeast of the city.
- Mesón de la tapa y la cerveza (the Tapa and Beer Fair): in Plaza España, scheduled from 12:00 pm to 4:30 pm and from 7:00 pm to midnight.
- Concerts: in the concert venue, next to Avenida del Mar and Ronda Este, with the performances by popular singers from across Spain. From Monday to Saturday, around midnight.
- Awarding ceremony of the best gaiatas of the current year: Tuesday night.

=== The last Saturday ===
Saturday is the day of the Offering of Flowers to the patron of the city, the Our Lady of Lledó. One of the most emotive acts of this festival is performed by the men of the Gaiata 1, who make a floral tapestry with the flowers that have been brought by the people who have visited their basilica.

For the flower offerers, the route to be taken is the following: Plaza Mayor, Calle Mayor, Plaza Maria Agustina and Avenida de la Mare de Déu del Lledó ending at the Paseo de Lledó, where the Basilica is located.

=== Laetare Sunday: Magdalena Vítol! ===
The Magdalena festival week formally ends on Laetare Sunday. Masses are held in the city cathedral and community chapels or churches to mark the conclusion of the festivities on a high note. Two notable events mark the final day of the festival.

==== The Grand Finale Fireworks ====
A pyrotechnic event running through the main streets of the center of Castellón takes place. The most daring run in front of the fireworks.

==== Magdalena Vítol! ====
At the end of the pyrotechnic traca, in the Plaza Mayor, the queens of the festival, in a symbolic act to officially conclude the year's festivities and begin the preparations for the next year, in a televised closing ceremony, shout from the balcony of City Hall to the crowds below in a festive final exchange, in Old Valencian:

- Festival Queens:Magdalena!
- Crowd: Vítol!

== Elements of the festival ==
=== Gaiatas ===
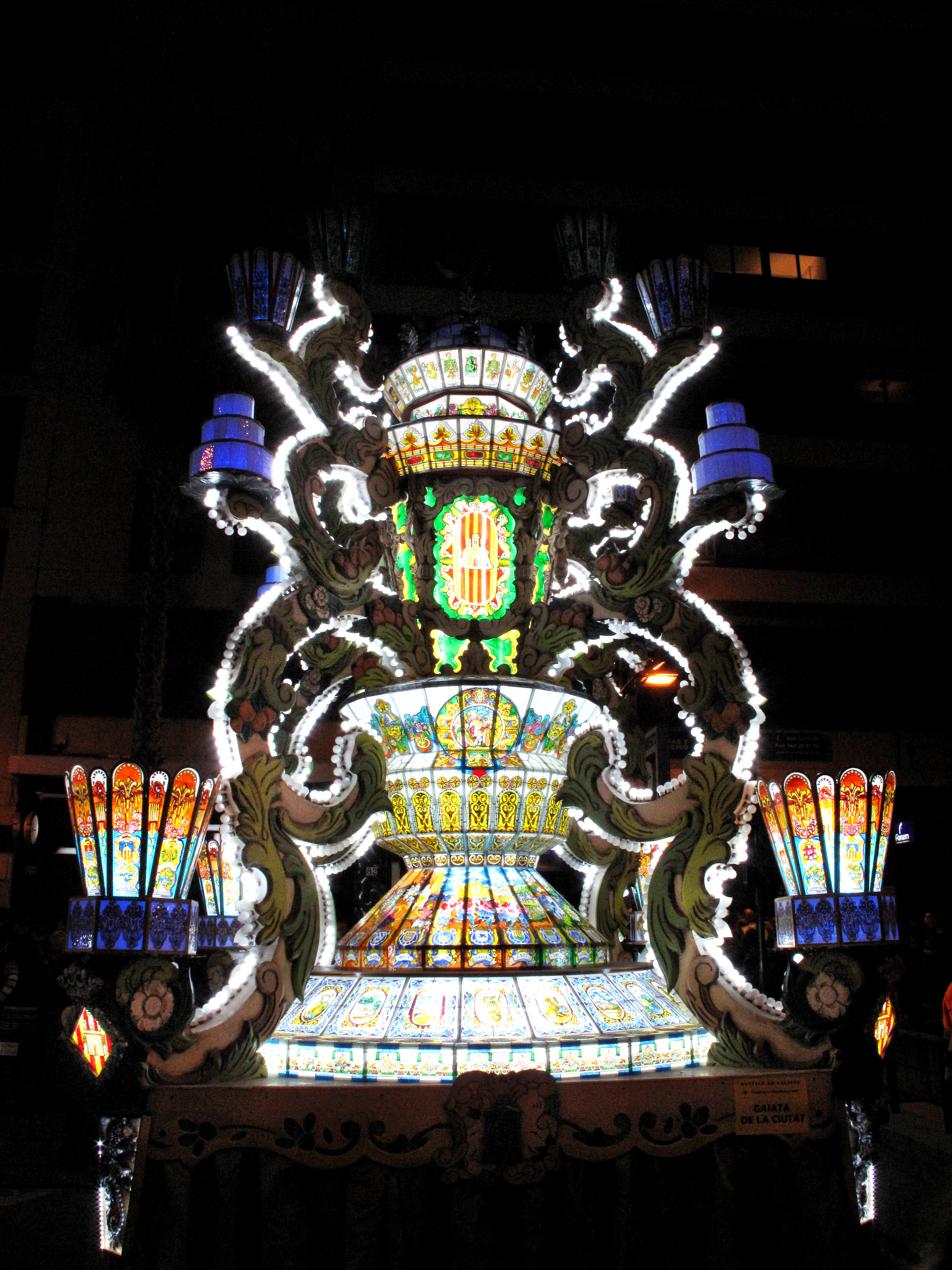
Gaiata of the city 2012, winner of the Gaiata's Contest of 2011 for the 15th Gaiata

The gaiatas are the festive monuments of the Magdalena Festival. Antonio Pascual Felip, a member of the First Central Board of Celebration, defined the gaiata as "a burst of light, with no fire or smoke". The gaiatas are monuments that are usually bout 19 feet high and resemble the lanterns that the inhabitants of Castellón used to find their way through the marshy ground at night. Also, the term gaiata refers to each of the 19 districts or neighbourhoods into which the city of Castellón is divided for the festival:

- Gaiata 1: Brancal de la Ciutat ()
- Gaiata 2: Fadrell ( y )
- Gaiata 3: Porta del Sol
- Gaiata 4: L'Armelar ()
- Gaiata 5: Hort dels Corders
- Gaiata 6: Farola - Ravalet
- Gaiata 7: Cor de la ciutat
- Gaiata 8: Portal de l'Om()
- Gaiata 9: L'Espartera ()
- Gaiata 10: El Toll
- Gaiata 11: Forn del Plà
- Gaiata 12: El Grau
- Gaiata 13: Sensal
- Gaiata 14: Castalia
- Gaiata 15: Sequiol ()
- Gaiata 16: Rafalafena
- Gaiata 17: Tir de Colom ()
- Gaiata 18: Crèmor
- Gaiata 19: La Cultural

During the festival, each district exhibits its gaiata in its central square.

=== Organizing bodies ===
- Federació Municipal de Festes Junta de Festes de Castelló.
- Federació Gestora de Gaiates.

=== Collas ===
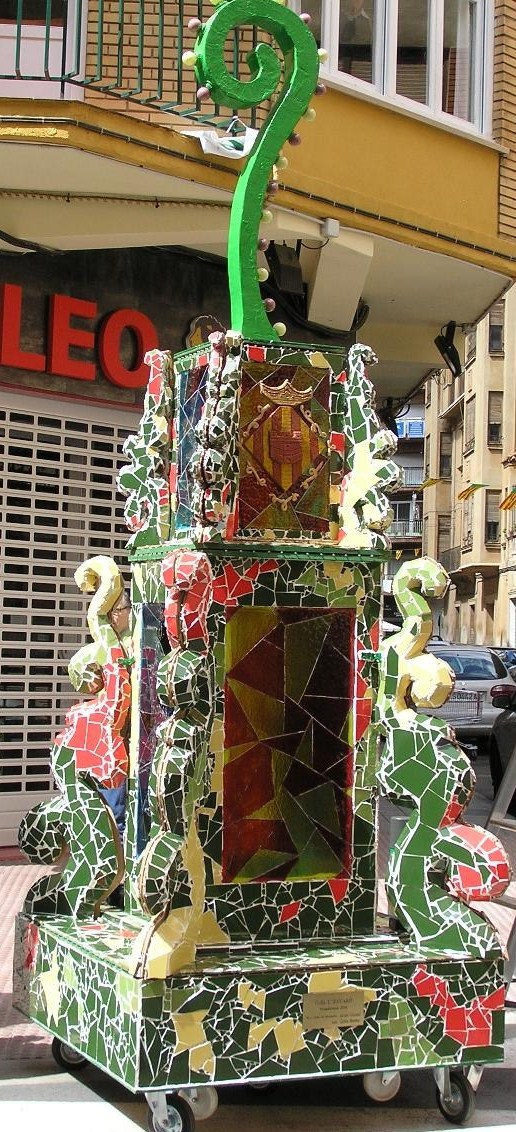
Ceramic Gaiata

In 2010, a cultural association named "Colla L'Esvaró" with over 20 members, was the first colla to produce a seven feet tall gaiata. As noted in the local newspaper Periódico Mediterraneo on March 5, 2010 , this gaiata was conceived by Carlos Benítez Barbero, a student of the course "Arts Decoratives del Món de la Festa de Castelló" and at "l'Escola d'art i Superior de Disseny de Castelló" (a higher education college of art and design in Castellón). In 2011, Carlos Benítez Barbero and Javier Granell Vives also created the first ceramic gaiata, a thirteen feet tall construction entirely covered by trencadis (a type of mosaic created from broken tile shards), faux stained glass and over 300 LED lights. Further information about this can be found in both newspapers El Mundo and Levante published on April 3, 2011.

== See also ==
- es:Bandera de Castellón de la Plana
- es:Castillo de Fadrell
- Magdalena chapel
- es:Grao de Castellón
- Fiestas del Grao de Castellón
