= Mascletà =

Pyrotechnics Event

Video of the mascletà in Valencia's Town Hall Square on 18 March 2023

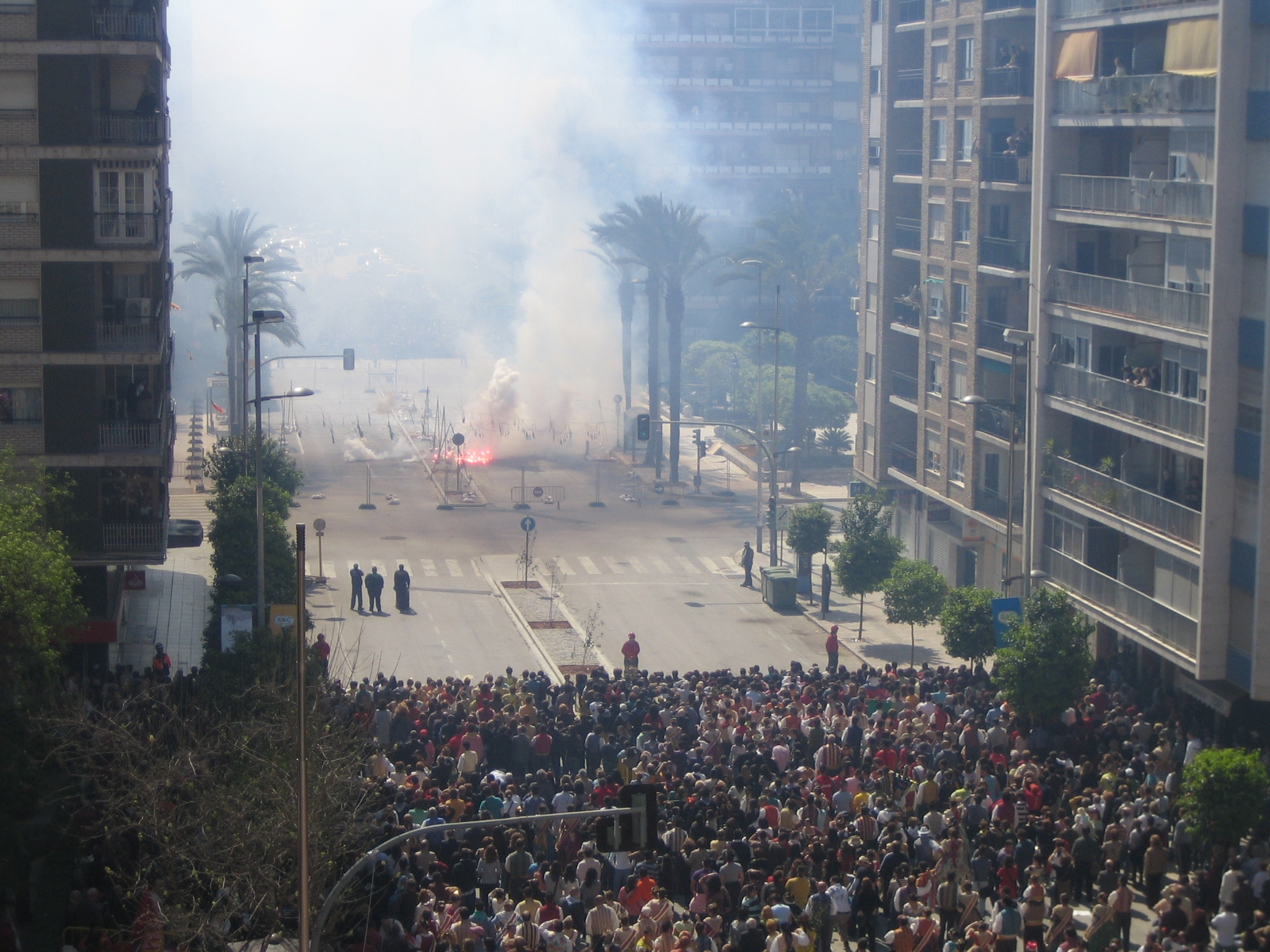
Fallas in the Valencian city of Alzira.

A mascletà (pronounced in Valencian: [maskleˈta]) is a pyrotechnic event characterized by the achievement of a noisy and rhythmic composition that features, particularly during daytime, in street festivities; it is typical of the Valencian Community (Spain). It gets its name from the masclets (very loud firecrackers) that are tied by a wick to form a line or firework display. These are usually fastened at a medium height with ropes or raised by cannons.

Unlike the fireworks that seek visual stimulation, the mascletades (pronounced in Valencian /maskle'taes/ and written in an informal way as mascletaes) aim to stimulate the body through strong rhythmic sounds of masclets; some people consider these sounds as "musical" sounds, while not neglecting the importance of the visual aspect. What distinguishes a mascletà from a succession of explosions is the rhythm that masclets must create to explode. It is essential that the force of the explosions must gradually rise, before coming to a dramatic conclusion; because without that, a mascletà can not be considered as such.

== History ==
Initially the mascletà was let off in the Plaça de l'Ajuntament of Valencia on March 19 (Saint Joseph's Day) as the culmination of the festivities. Afterwards, the number of mascletàs was extended up to the current 19 (from March 1 to 19). The mascletà of Valencia has continuously evolved, especially in technique and in the amount of powder used. For security reasons the amount of gunpowder has been limited to 120 kg per mascletà. The only exception has been on March 19, 2008, when the limit went up to 240 kg. The technique has evolved and nowadays electronic programmes are used to ignite the explosions. This allows more accuracy and increases safety. Traditionally, pyrotechnicians would ignite the mascletà with a wick.

== Places in Valencian Community where mascletades are let off ==
The mascletades are famous throughout all the Community of Valencia but those especially well-known are from March 1 to 19 at 2:00 pm in the Plaça de l'Ajuntament of Valencia and from March 3 to 19 at 2:00 pm in the Plaça del Regne of Alzira, both during the Fallas festivities. There are also mascletades during the festivities of the Magdalena in Castellón and in Alicante from June 19 to 24 in the Plaça dels Estels the festivities of the Bonfires of Saint John. For some years, the mascletades have also been introduced during the August festivities in Elche and they are let off in the Passeig de l'Estació, where you can appreciate the beautiful image of the Palmeral of Elche.

== Parts ==
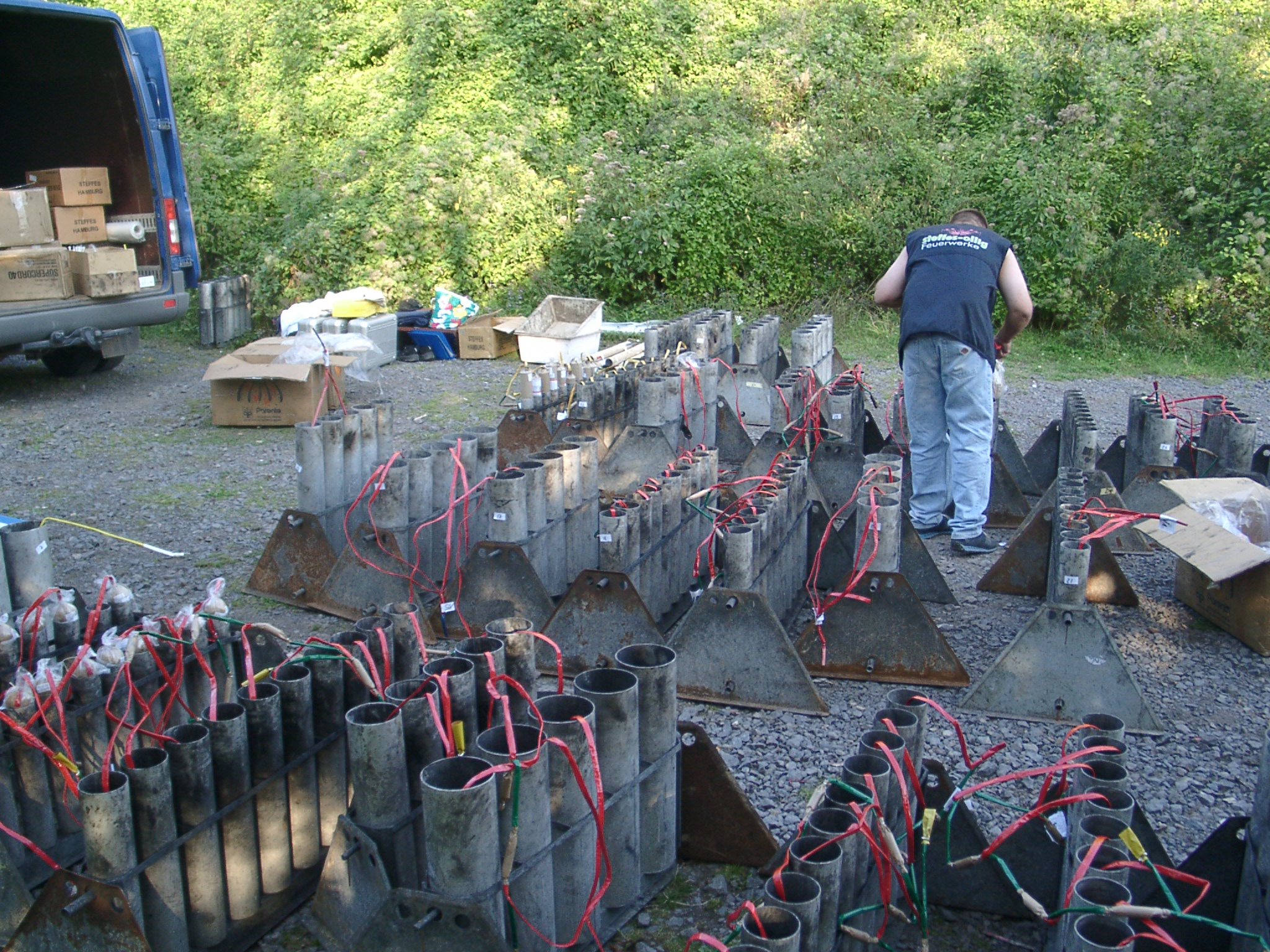
Preparing a mascletà

A mascletà usually consists of four parts:

- Start: The show begins with both sound and visual effects.
- Body: During the central part of the mascletà the intensity and volume goes up.
- Terratrèmol (earthquake): The powerful firecrackers called masclets, burst in unison.
- Air show: Intense aerial fireworks. They are always visible for spectators and are accompanied by colours.

Innovations have been introduced in these four parts, and they have made mascletades more complex than a "traditional" structure. The use of electronic controllers allows complexity and a combination of both air and ground pyrotechnics.
