= El Fadrí =

Coordinates: 39°59′8″N 0°2′13.8″W

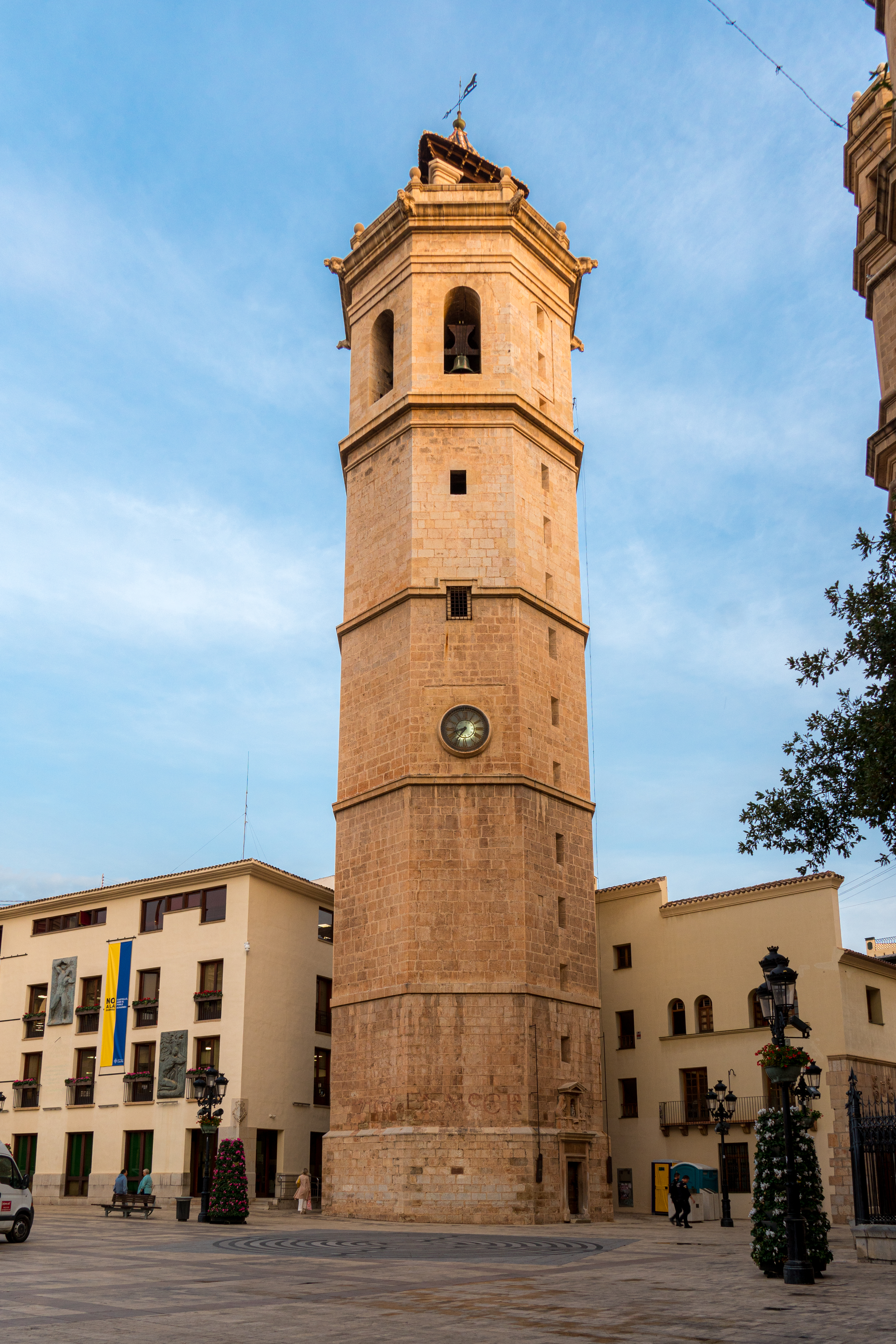

El Fadrí, also known as the Fadrí Tower, is a standing alone bell-tower of the Gothic procathedral Castelló Cathedral of Castellón de la Plana, Spain. It was built in the 15th century, commencing in 1440 and completed in 1604. It is an octagonal building, about 58 metres (190 ft) high. It was built in Valencian Gothic style. A discontinuous spiral staircase gives access to the clock chamber, the clergyman's cell, the bell ringer's home, and the bell chamber.
