= Fogueres d'Alacant =

Festival in Alicante, Spain

The Bonfires of Saint John (Valencian: Fogueres de Sant Joan, Spanish: Hogueras de San Juan) are a traditional and popular festival celebrated in the city of Alicante, Spain, from 19 to 24 June. The celebration ultimately stems from a tradition of bonfires for Saint John's Eve that can be found in many places, among them the Mediterranean coast of Spain, especially Catalonia, Galicia and the Valencian Community; in Alicante (Valencian: Alacant), it's the official and most important festivity in the city. It was officially declared as a Fiesta of International Tourist Interest in 1983 and a Bien de Interés Cultural in 2014.

== Background ==
Midsummer eve festivals (St. John's Eve among Christians) have roots in ancient celebrations related to the summer solstice. Bonfires were lit to protect against evil spirits which were believed to roam freely when the sun was turning southward again. In later years, witches were also thought to be on their way to meetings with other powerful beings.

Fire features in many of the celebrations, with people gathering together and creating large bonfires from any kind of wood, such as old furniture, and sharing food and drinks while teens and children jump over the fires. Parties are often organized at open areas, such as beaches, where bonfires are lit and a set of firework displays usually take place. On the Spanish Mediterranean coast, especially in Catalonia and the Valencian Community, special foods such as coca de Sant Joan are also served on this occasion. In Alicante, since 1928, the bonfires of Saint John were developed into elaborate constructions inspired by the Fallas of Valencia.

== Celebration in Alicante ==
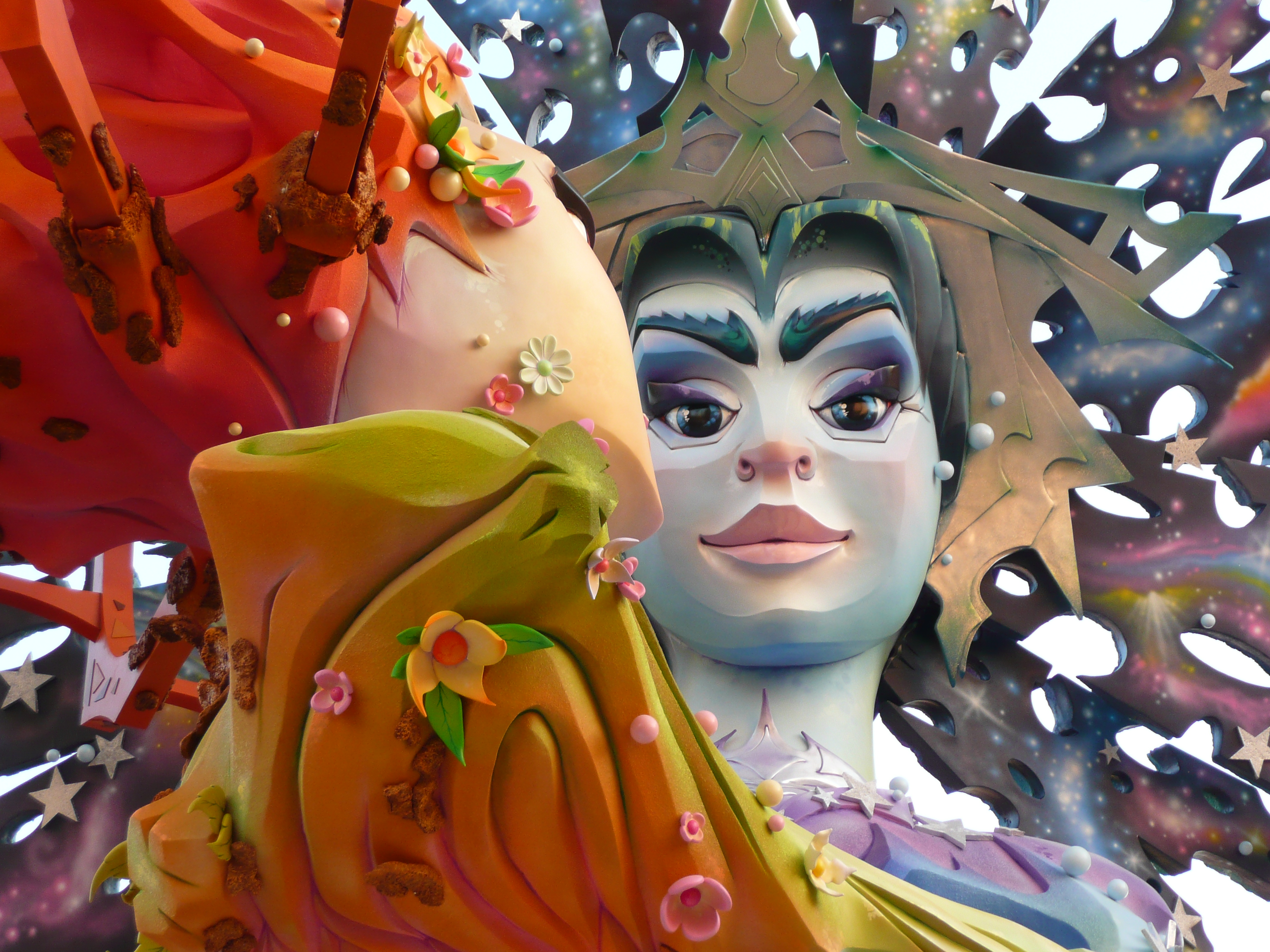
2008, Gran Via La Ceramica.

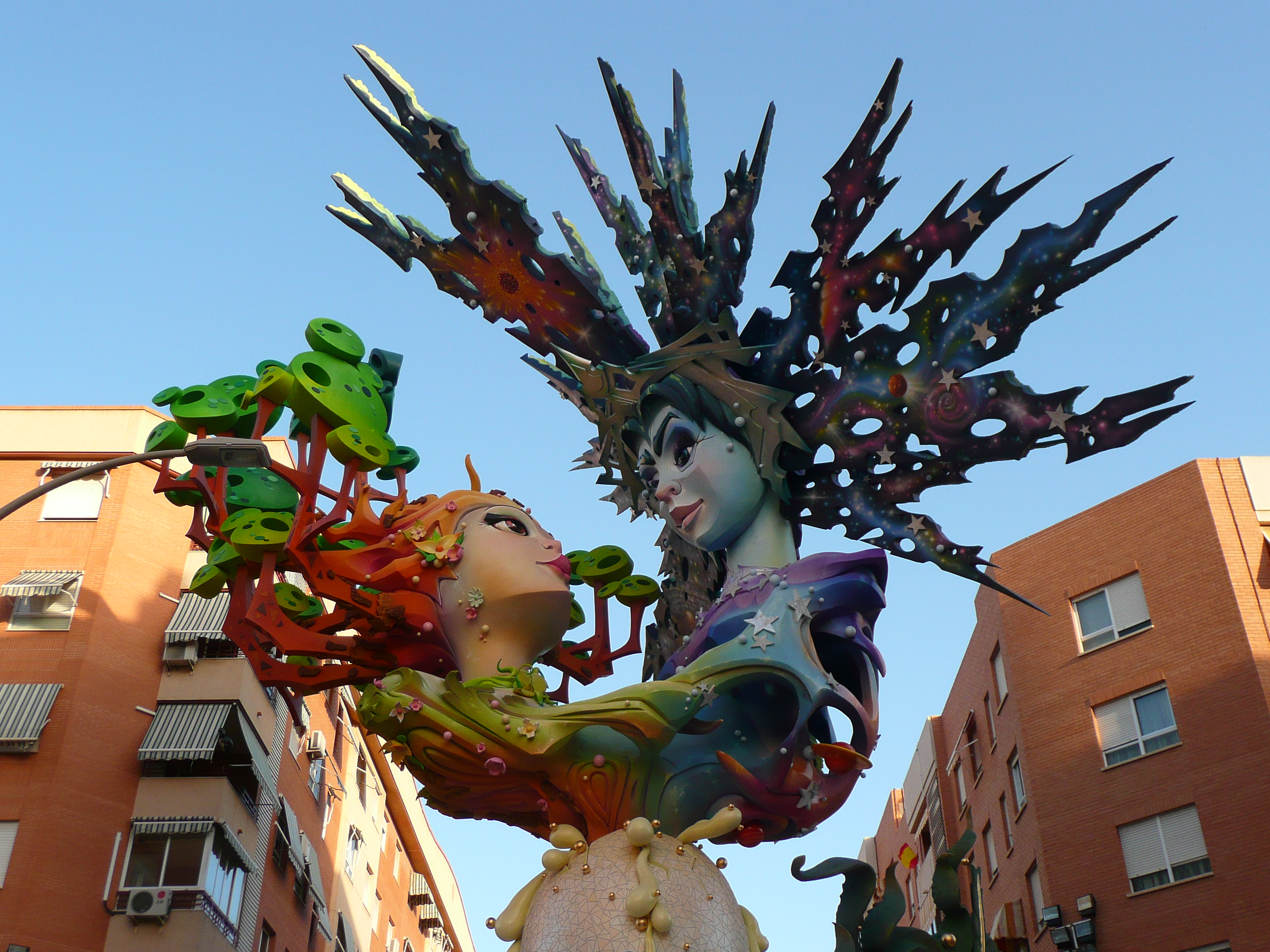
2008, Gran Via La Ceramica.

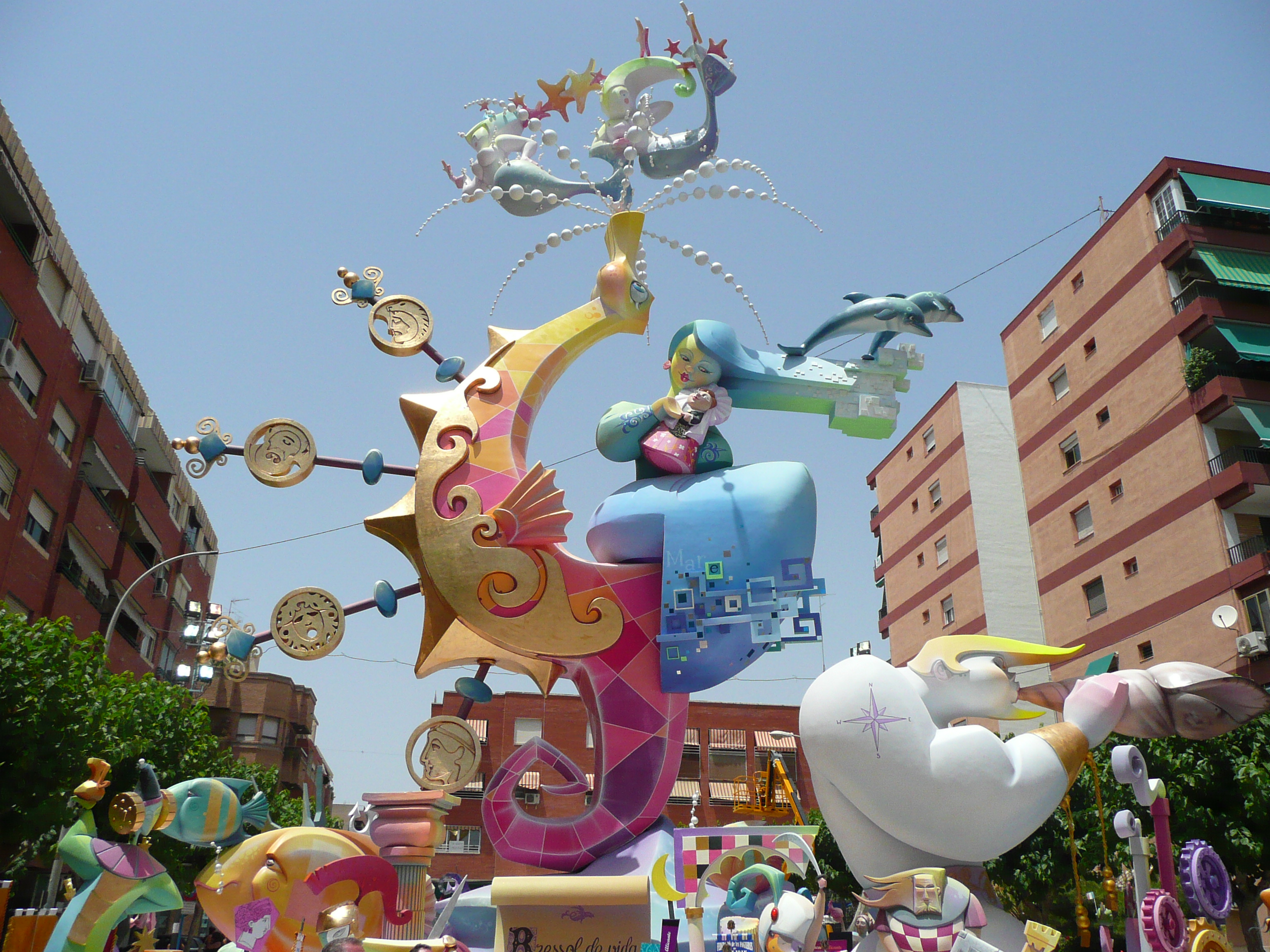
2008, Florida Portazgo.

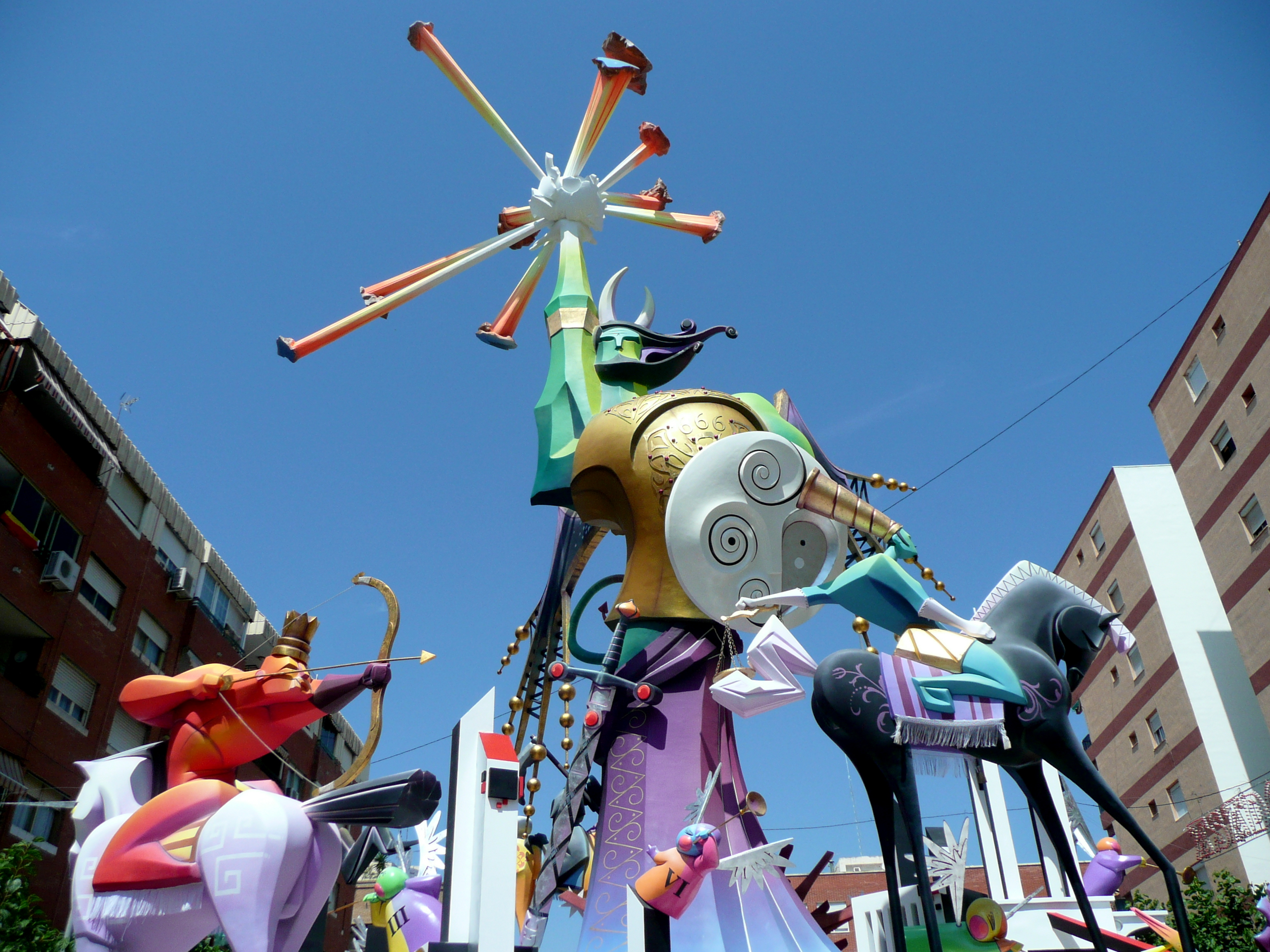
2009, Florida Portazgo.

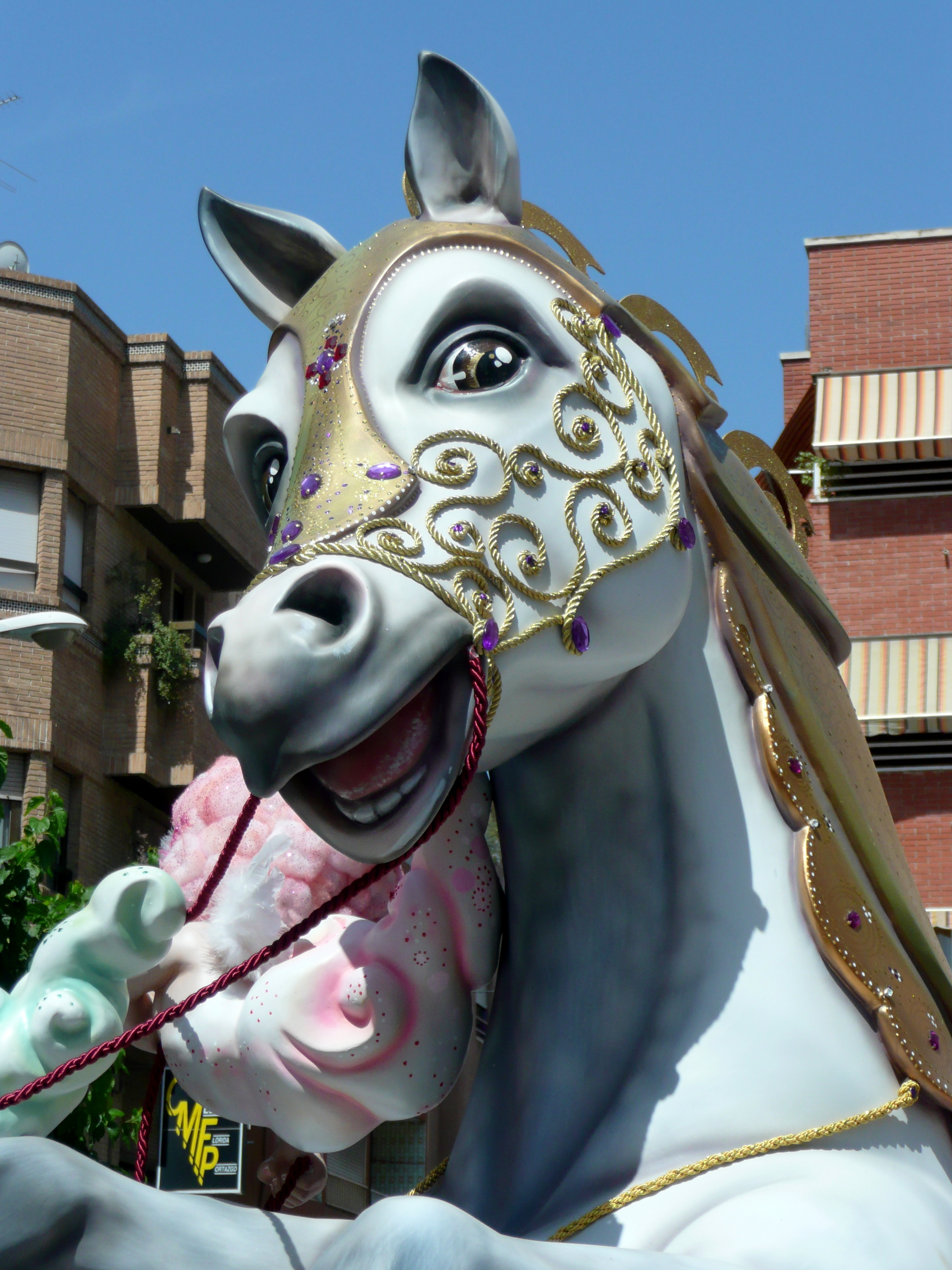
2009, Florida Portazgo.

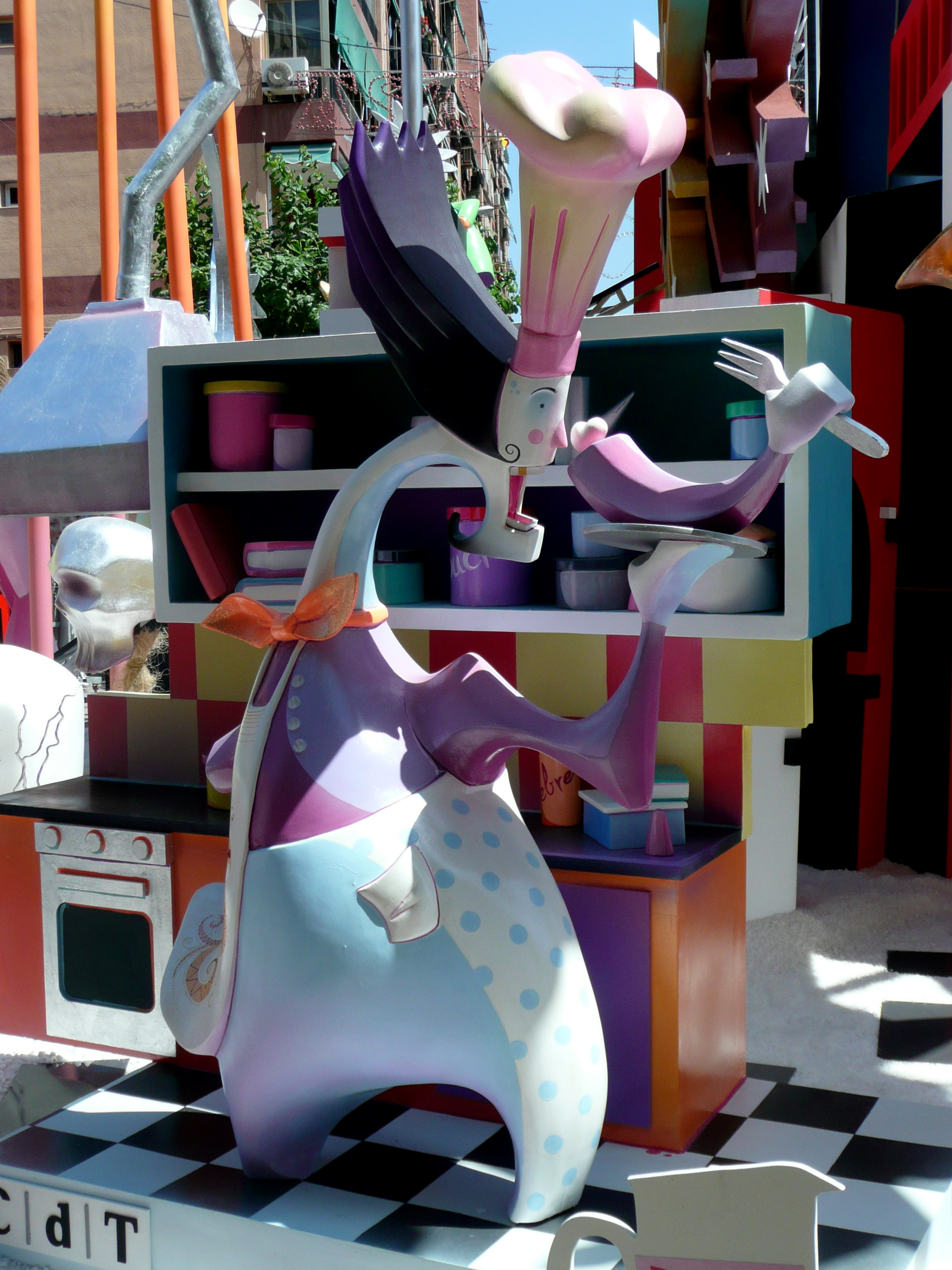
2009, Florida Portazgo.

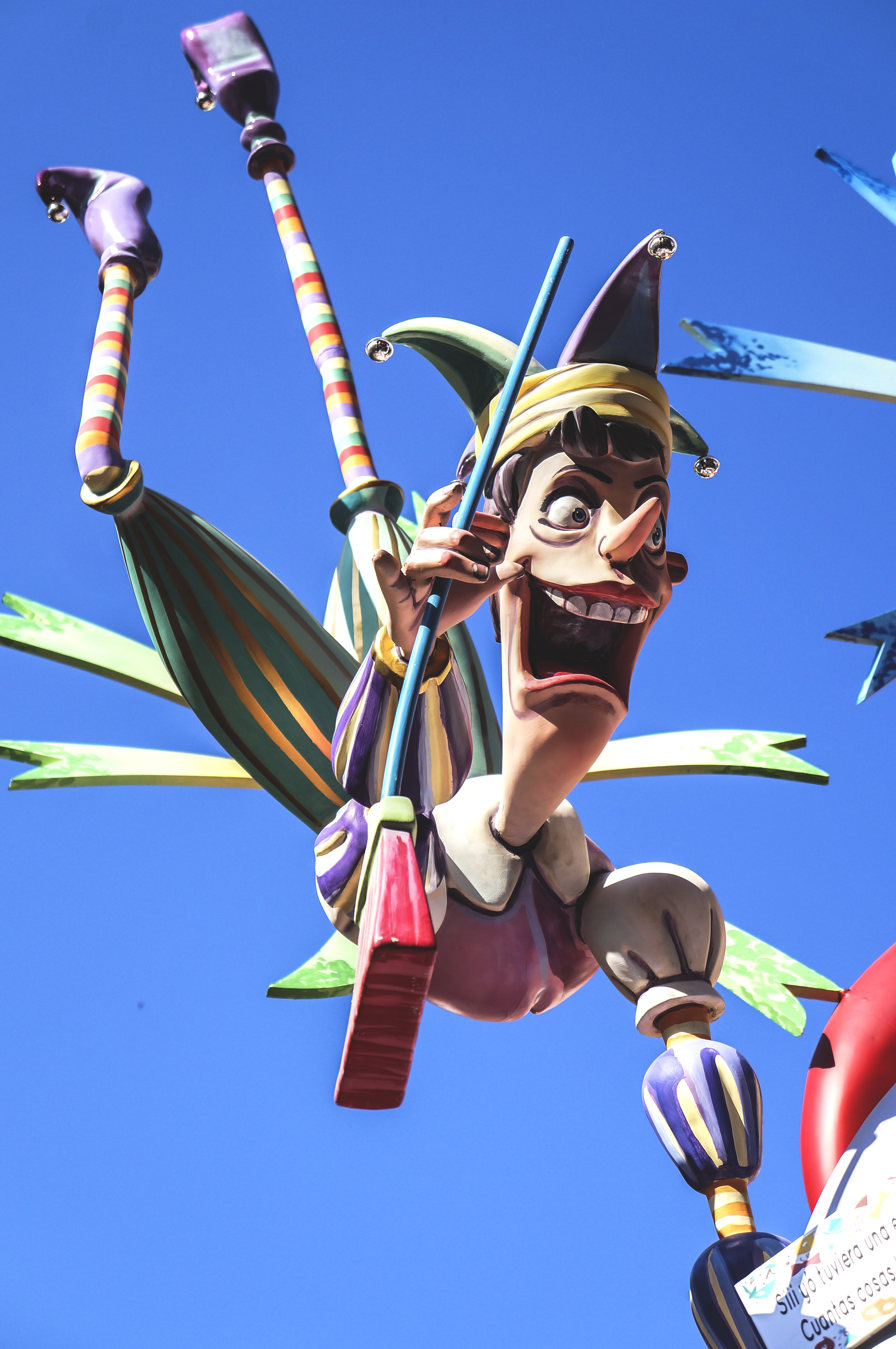
2015, La Florida-Plaza Magallanes.

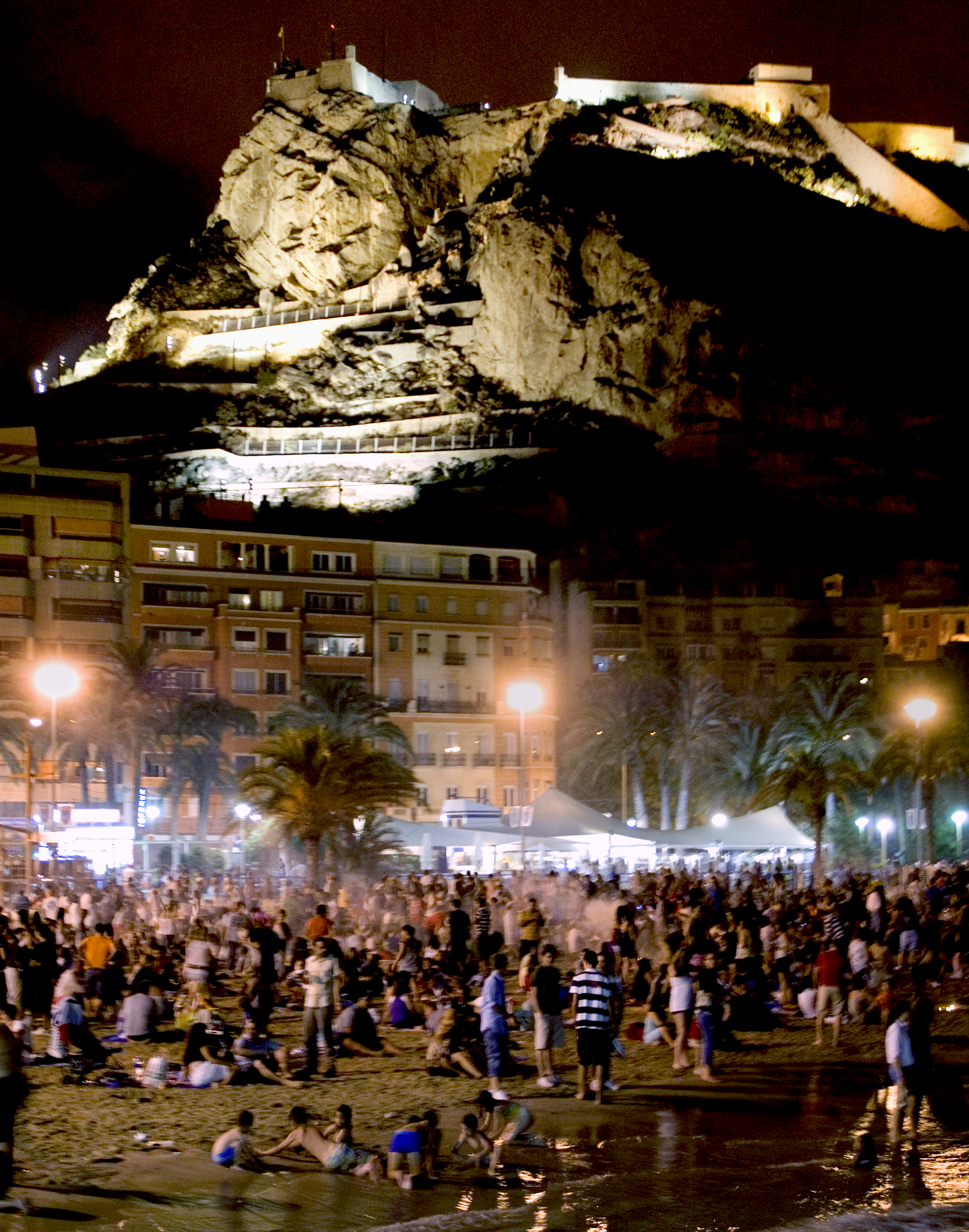
Castle of Santa Bárbara and San Juan beach in Alacant at the final night of the festival.

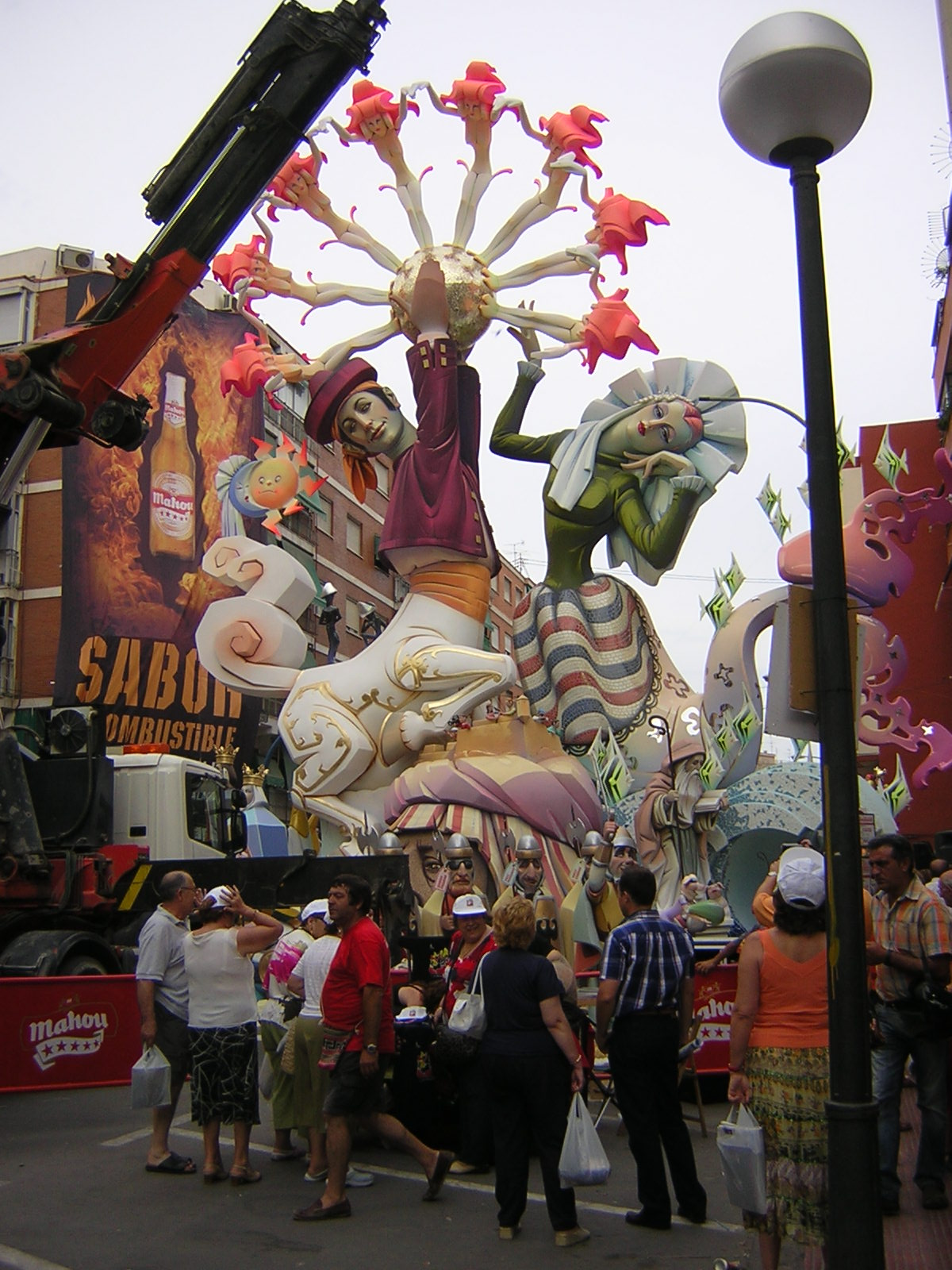
A bonfire of Saint John, 2005

=== Origins ===
Before 1928, the bonfires of Saint John had been celebrated in Alicante as it had been elsewhere in Europe: by burning old pieces of furniture on the night of Saint John on 24 June. The Bonfires festival in Alicante originated in 1928. Jose María Py, the founder of the festival, felt that Alicante needed an important fiesta, and came up with an idea to combine bonfires with an older Valencian tradition known as the "fallas".

=== Events ===
19 June

- The Bonfires start with the 'Set Up' (la plantà) when monuments, street ninots and archways to the "barraques" are set up in the streets. A pie of tuna (coca amb tonyina) and early figs (bacores) are eaten at night.

19–24 June

- The despertà occurs at 08:00 – Neighbours are awakened with a great deal of noise in all the districts of the city.
- The mascletà takes place at 14:00. It is a combination of fireworks and a very long string of firecrackers (bangers).
- At night, from 23:00 to 06:00 there are street parties in all the districts of the city. People dance and drink all night at the "racós" (sing. racó) and the "barraques" (sing. barraca).

21 June

- The Street Band Parade (Entrada de bandas) occurs at 19:00.

22 June

- At 11:30, the Prize Giving Parade (Desfilada entrega de premios) takes place
- At 19:00, the Flower Offering Parade for St Mary of the Remedy (Ofrenda de flores a la Virgen del Remedio) takes place.

In the three parades, people wear the traditional garments from Alicante, and, in the Flower Offering, women wear mantilla and they have a bunch of flowers.

23 June

- At 21:00, the International Folklore Parade (Desfile folklórico internacional) takes place.

24 June :

- At 24:00 (morning of 25 June), the Palm (firework) (La Palmera), occurs. This is a magnificent cascade of fireworks, and it is followed by the Burning (La Cremà), which is the culmination of the festival.

Before the main events, in the beginning of June, there are the Ninot and Children's Ninot Exhibition (Exposición del Ninot y del Ninot infantil), the Paella Contest (Certamen de Paellas), the Tribute to Past Foguerers and Barraquers (Homenaje a Foguerers y Barraquers muertos), the Opening Ceremony (El Pregón), the Ninot Parade (Desfile del Ninot), and the Street Parade of Ninots competition (La plantà dels Ninots de Carrer).

After 24 June, there is the Firework Display Competition (Concurso de Castillos de Fuegos Artificiales) and the String of Firecrackers Display (Concurso de tracas) in Postiguet Beach. There are also sports events and a Medieval Street Market.

The Bonfires commissions host a number of other events during the rest of the year. In autumn, there is a musical and dancing competition known as the Artistic Competition (Concurso artístico). In December, there is the Christmas Carol Competition (Concurso Navideño). In May, there is the Beauty of the Fire Contest (Festival d’elecció de la Bellea del Foc), which is the most important event outside the festive period, followed by the Beauty of the Fire Proclamation (Proclamació de la Bellea del Foc). During the year, there are the Presentations of the Beauties in all the districts of Alicante.

=== Organization ===
Bonfires are organised into commissions which fundraise and host the other events throughout the year. A member of a commission is called a foguerer. A commission usually represents one area, a place or an avenue in the city, but there are many areas with numerous commissions. (For example, Carolinas has five commissions: Carolinas Altas, Carolines Bajas, Foguerer-Carolinas, Doctor Bergez-Carolinas and Bola de Oro.) In Alicante there are more than 90 commissions (and so many others for children).

A barraca is a group of friends who don't take part in all the activities, and they raise money only to eat, drink and dance during the festival in a place in the street called the barraca. The member of a barraca is called barraquero.

The barracas and the racós are places in the street with tables, chairs, a bar, an orchestra and a dance floor. They are places for people to eat, talk, drink, dance and socializing during the festivities. The difference between the barraca and the racó is that the racó is for the entire district and admission is free, while entrance to the barraca is restricted. The racó is made by the foguerers and the "barraca" is made by the "barraquers".

The commissions organize and take part in several events during the year: an artistic competition, parades, beauty contests, etc. These activities are open to the general public and the participation of the district's residents is very important and, sometimes, they are the main group. In districts such as Ciudad de Asís, Florida Alta (or Florida Portazgo), Los Ángeles and Carolinas Altas, the relationship between the commission and the district's residents is very strong.

A very important source of financing for the festival is a lottery administered by the commission, although there are other sources such as tombolas, raffles, or sales.

=== Beauties ===
Beauty is the most emblematic element in the Bonfires after the monuments. The Beauty is a woman who is the queen of the festival . There are both Beauties and Young Beauties representing both Bonfires and Children's Bonfires respectively.

Since a Beauty is the representative of a particular commission, there are near 90 Beauties and so many Young Beauties in Alicante. A Beauty can have two or four Honour Ladies in her commission.

There are certain Honour Ladies for the whole city. The Beauty of the Fire (Bellea del Foc) is the queen of the festival in all the city, who is always accompanied by the six Ladies of the Fire (Dames del Foc).

=== Clothes ===
There are three types of traditional clothes:

Novia Alicantina (Alicantinian Bride): the costume that Beauties and Honour Ladies wear. It is made up of:

- A band in the hair
- A white and round mantilla
- A small lemon blossom bunch
- Two hangings
- A cross with jewellery around the neck
- A black, velvet, waist with long sleeves
- A fan
- A black apron with jewellery
- A long skirt
- A petticoat (sinagües)
- White stockings
- Black heels

Labradora (farmer): the costume for the other women. It is made up of:

- A band in the hair with flowers
- Two hangings
- A cross with a black ribbon in the neck
- A white piece called "manteleta"
- A waist made in colours
- A white apron
- A long skirt, the same of the Beauties
- A petticoat (sinagües)
- White stockings
- Black heels

Zaragüelles: the costume for the men. It is made up of:

- A scarf in the head or in the neck
- A cotton, white, shirt
- A blanket with pockets
- A long sash at the same colour that the scarf
- Full white trousers called "zaragüelles"
- White stockings
- Shoes called "espardenyes"

=== Art: Monuments ===
Bonfires are an art show. In autumn, there is an artistic competition among the Bonfire Commissioners. In the Festival, there are Ninots (wooden figures) in the street. This is an old tradition that was revived in 2008. Every year there is an Official Festival Poster, a beautiful art demonstration. But the most important in this festival are the Monuments, who are called Bonfires (Fogueres). They are made of wood, cardboard, mud, paintings and, nowadays, of cork and polyurethane too. A Bonfire is not only an artistic creation, it is a critique of the societal, political and economic situation of the world in general and the city of Alicante especially. Critiques are made across the "Ninot" or figure. The Ninot usually represents a famous person, often an amusing parody of a politician.

The Bonfires are not the same as the Valencian Fallas. When Bonfires originated in Alicante there were not made by "faller" artists, and the first Bonfires were made by local painters and sculptors. They did not imitate the Valencian style; they were very vanguardist and they followed Art-Dèco and other artistic currents. This vanguard continued throughout the history of the event (except 70's, when Valencian style was adopted), and today Bonfires are different still.

A Bonfire is paid for by contributions by the Bonfire Commission, together with donations from residents and shops. The Monument Competition is the most important contest in the Bonfire events. Monuments are divided into seven categories according to the price. There are 6 categories from 1st to 6th, and a Special Category. The latter category consists of more expensive bonfires costing more than 60,100 euros.

The most important artists throughout the Bonfire's history are Gastón Castelló, Ramón Marco, Remigio Soler, Ángel Martín, Pedro Soriano, José Muñoz and Paco Juan. The most successful district is Benalúa, with 18 victories. Other successful districts are Ciudad de Asís, Carolinas Altas, Mercado Central, Alfonso el Sabio and Hernán Cortés.

Bonfires are kindled on the 20th in an act called "La plantà", and they are burned on the 24th in a very beautiful and emotive act called "La cremà" (the burning). The former is the beginning of the Alicantinian Festival and the latter marks the end of the Festival.

== See also ==
- Festa de São João do Porto
- Festa junina
- St Jonas' Festival
- Jāņi
