= Castellón de la Plana =

Castellón de la Plana Castelló de la Plana
- City and municipality
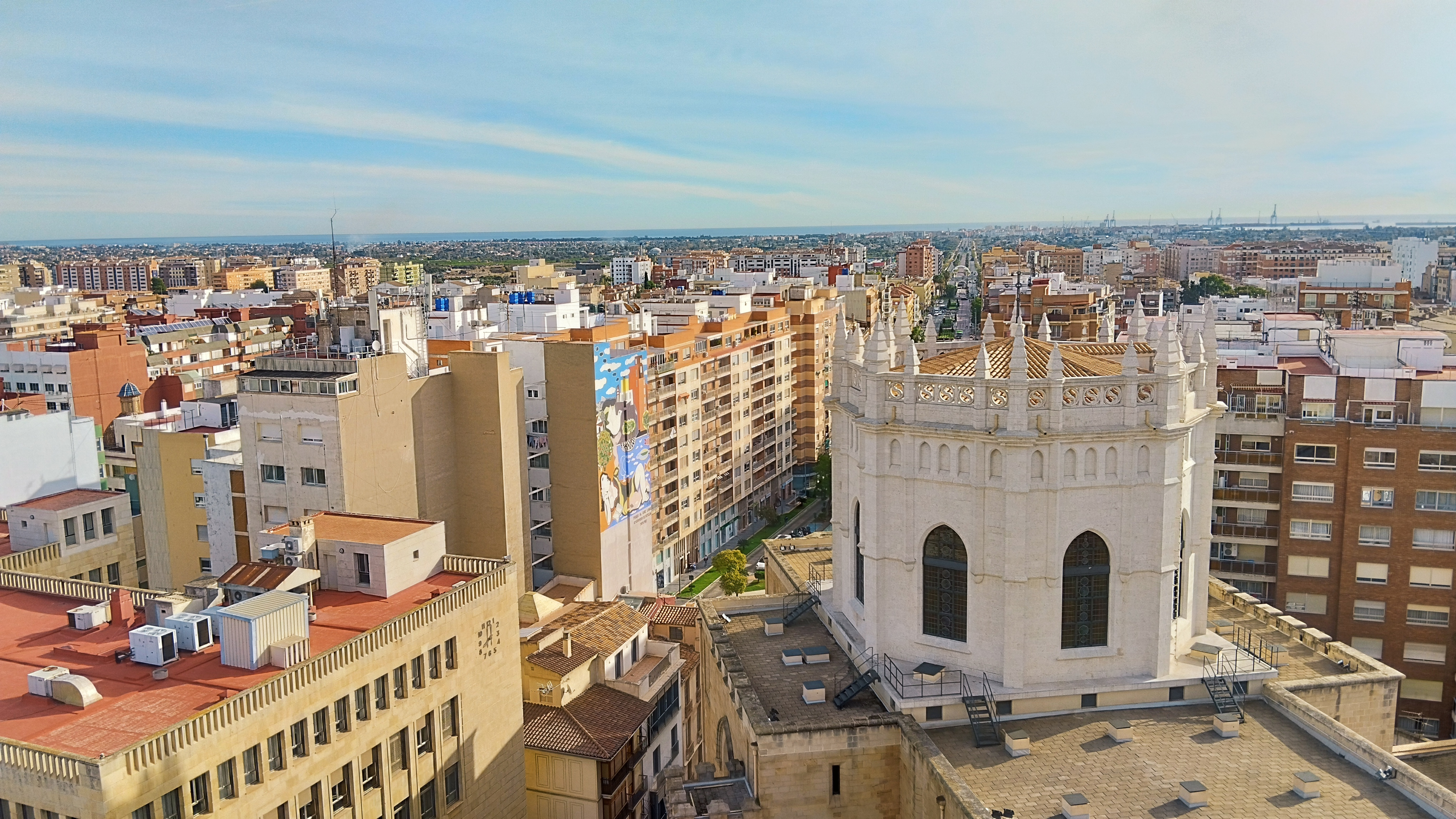
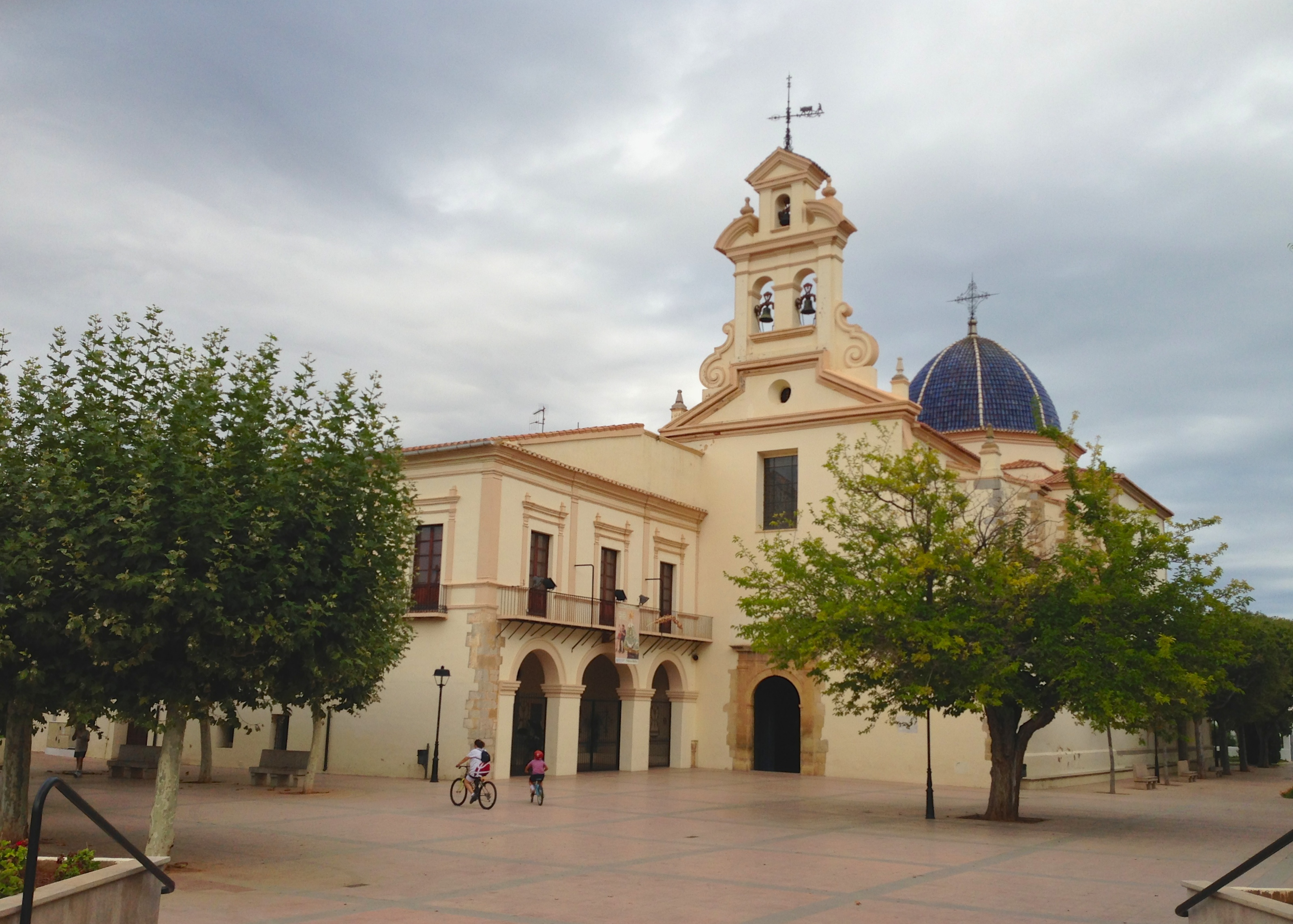
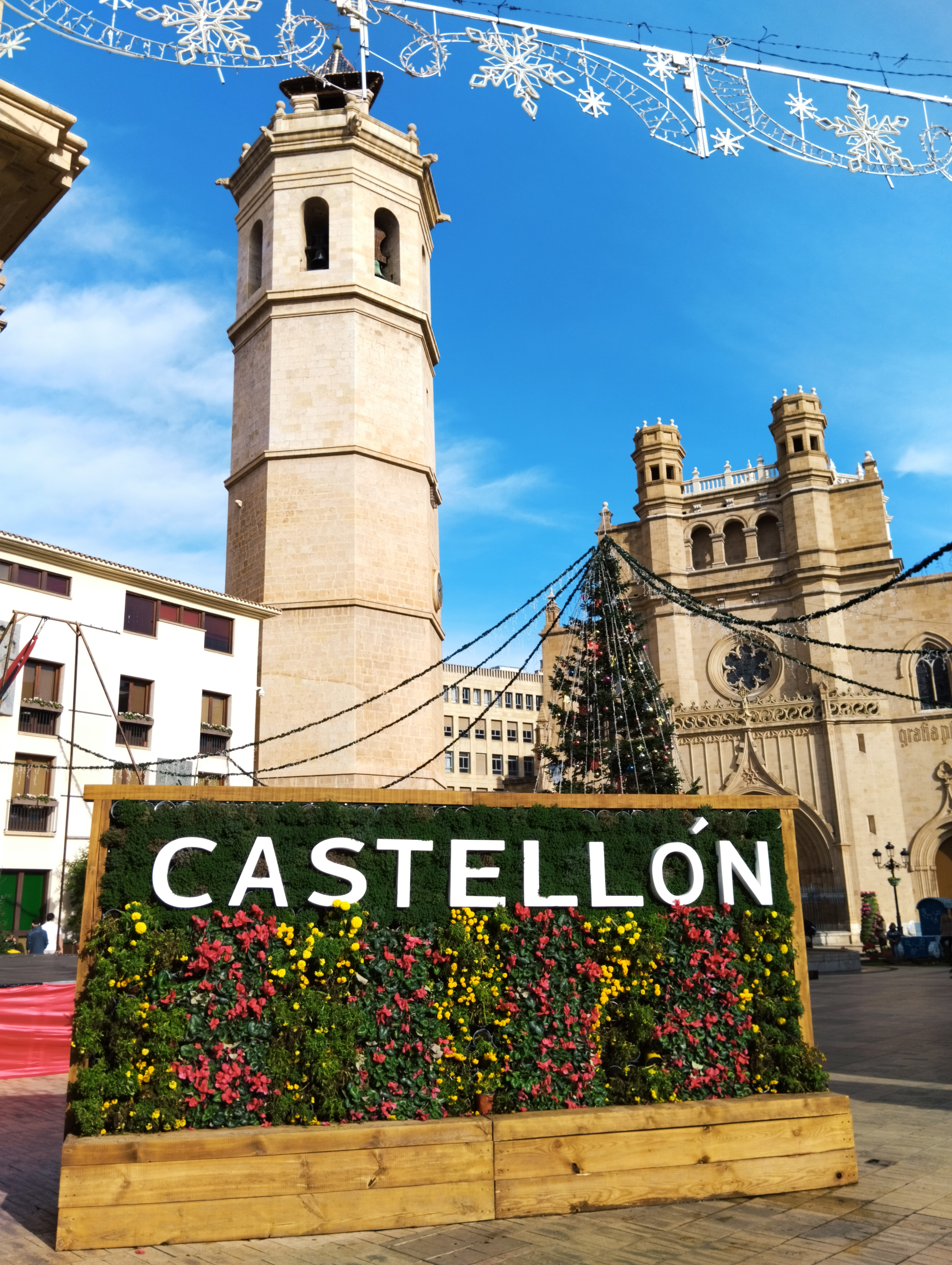
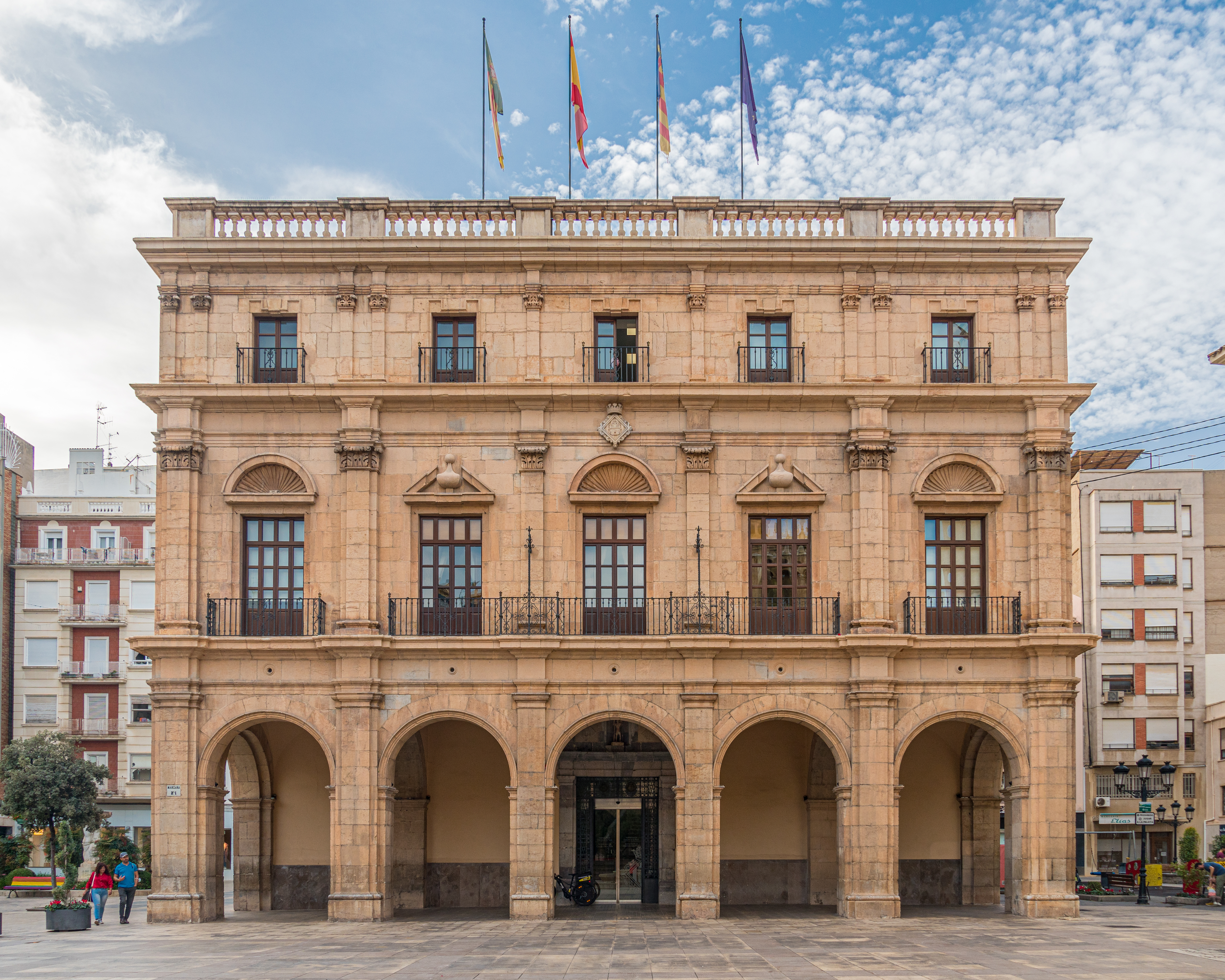
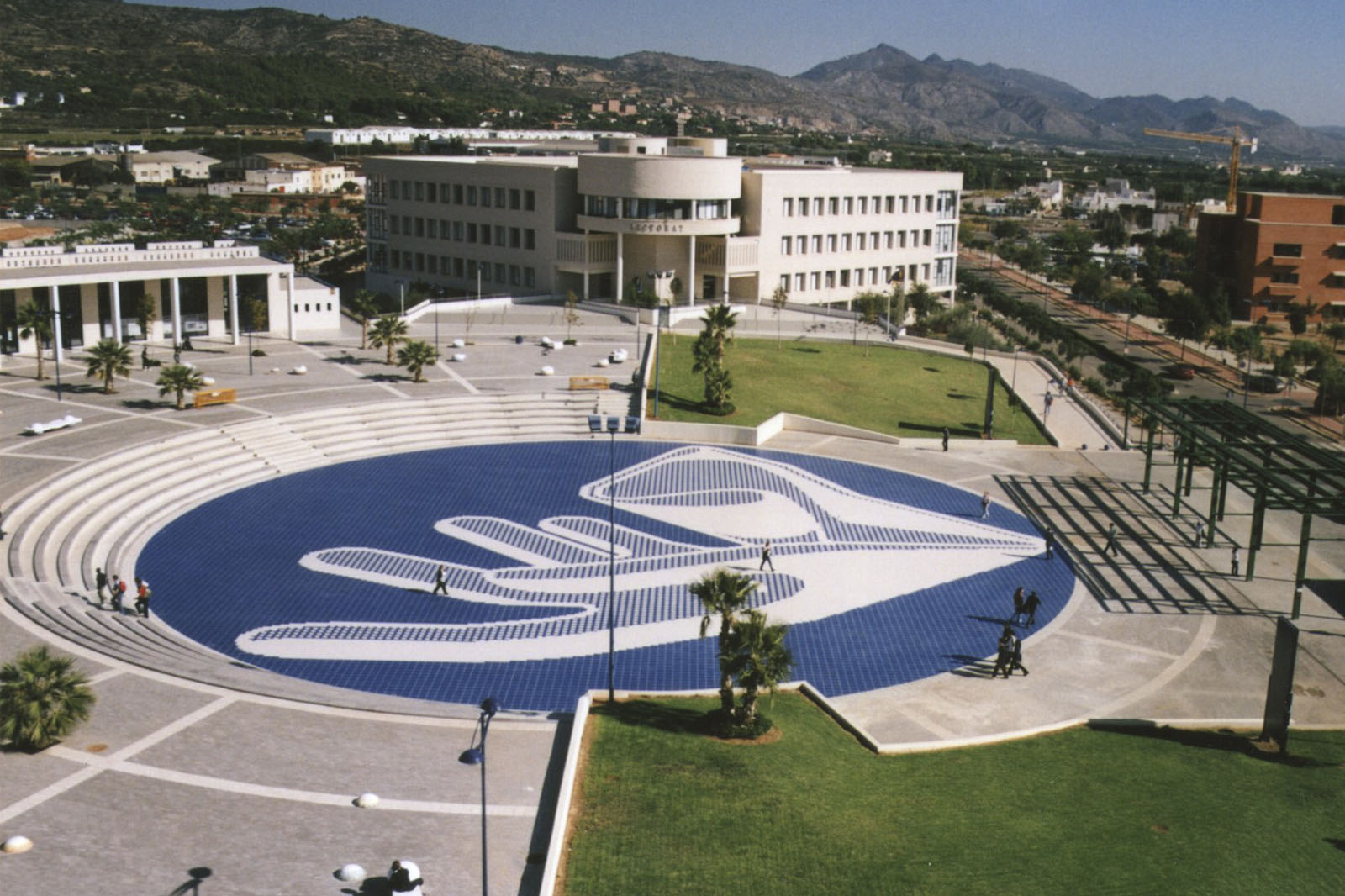
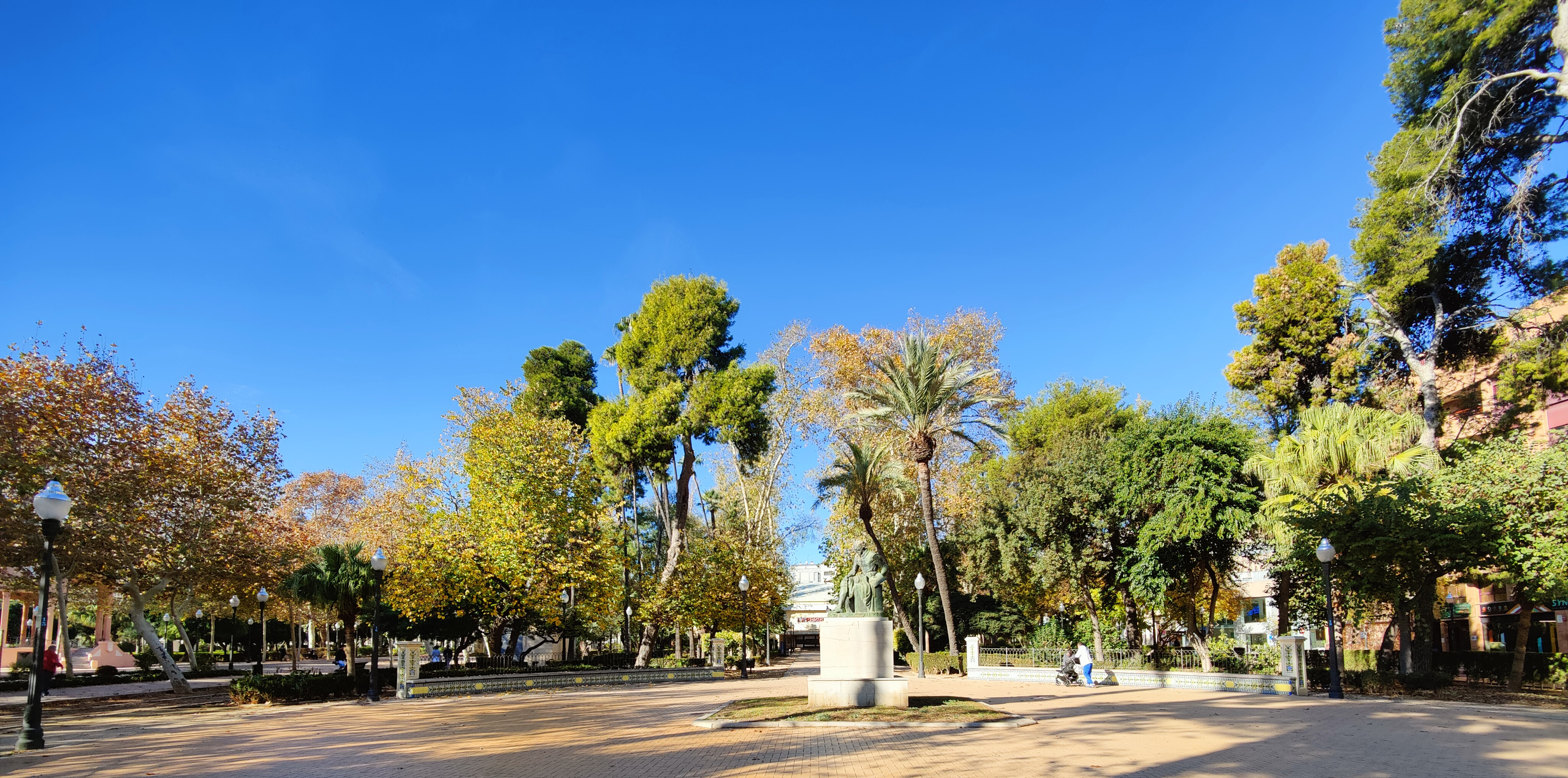
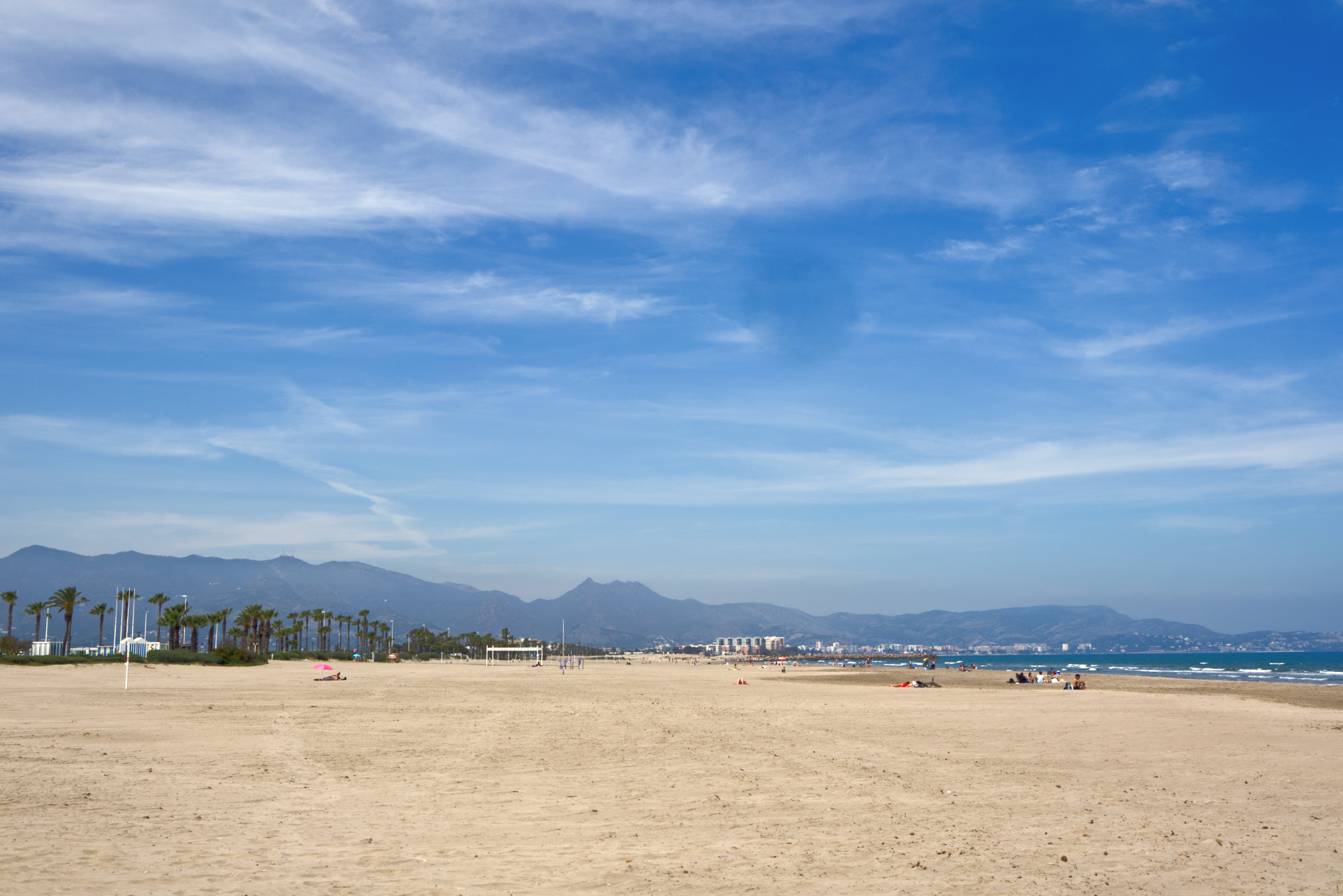
- View of the city Nuestra Señora del Lledó basilica Main Square with El Fadrí and the Co-Cathedral City Hall Jaume I University Ribalta Park Gurugú Beach

- Flag Coat of arms
- Interactive map of Castellón de la Plana
- Location within Province of Castellón Location within Valencian Community Location within Spain
- Coordinates: 39°58′59″N 0°1′59″W
- Country: Spain
- Autonomous Community: Valencian Community
- Province: Castelló / Castellón
- Comarca: Plana Alta

Government
  - Alcaldessa (Mayoress): Begoña Carrasco (2023) (PP)

Area
  - Total: 108.78 km^{2} (42.00 sq mi)
- Elevation: 30 m (98 ft)
- Highest elevation: 609 m (1,998 ft)
- Lowest elevation: 0 m (0 ft)

Population (2025-01-01)
  - Total: 183,711
  - Density: 1,688.8/km^{2} (4,374.1/sq mi)
- Demonyms: • castellonenc, -a (Val.) • castellonense (Sp.)
- Official language(s): Valencian; Spanish
- Linguistic area: Valencian
- Time zone: UTC+1 (CET)
  - Summer (DST): UTC+2 (CEST)
- Postal code: 12001-12006
- Dialing code: +34 (ES); 964- / 864- (CS)
- ISO 3166-2: ES-CS
- Website: www.castello.es

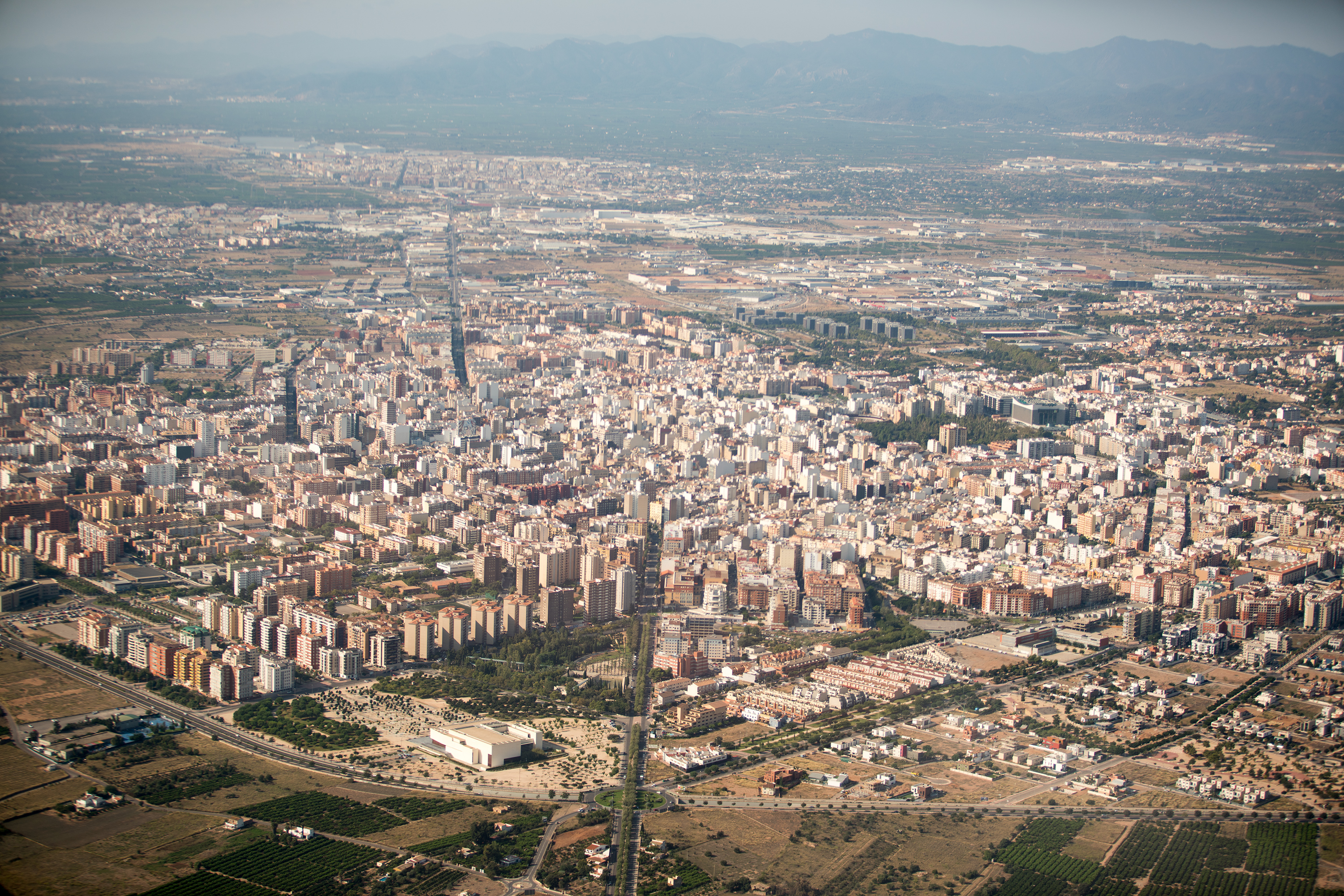
Aerial view of the city

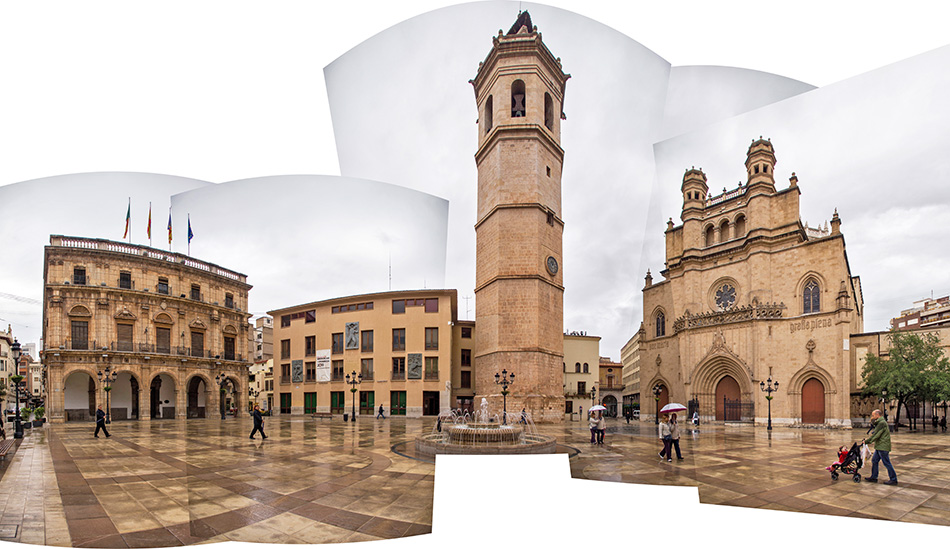
Plaza Mayor

Castellón de la Plana, (Note: Spanish: [kasteˈʎon de la ˈplana]) in Spanish, or Castelló de la Plana, (Note: Valencian: [kasteˈʎo ðe la ˈplana]) in Valencian (or simply Castellón or Castelló), is the capital city of the province of Castellón, in the Valencian Community, Spain. It is located near the eastern coastline of the Iberian Peninsula by the Mediterranean Sea. The main urban core lies some kilometres inland while the detached district of Grau was built around the Port. The Desert de les Palmes mountain range rises to the north.

According to the 2018 census, Castellón has a population of 174,264 inhabitants, ranking as the fourth most populated municipality in the Valencian Community. Castellón is part of a larger metropolitan area along with the neighbouring municipalities of Villarreal, Almassora, Benicàssim, Borriol, and Borriana. The Prime Meridian, or Greenwich Meridian, intersects the 40th parallel at Castellón de la Plana and is commemorated with a monolith in Meridian Park (Parc del Meridià) located at the exact point where this occurs.

== History ==
During the Islamic era, it was named قسطلونة (Qasṭalūnah). The town inherited the name from a Moorish castle on the top of the hill of Magdalena (the Castle of Fadrell), a ḥiṣn dominating over a demarcation roughly consisting of the current-day municipalities of Castellón and Almassora. The area capitulated to James I of Aragon in 1233. This was followed by a series of attempts to create new settlements in the area starting with the alqueria of Benimahomet, the first Christian project to leave the castle, with mixed results. Following the 1247 mudéjar revolt, James I decreed the expulsion of the mudéjares from the area in 1248. The current settlement was however not founded until the 1250s, after James I, on 8 September 1251, granted Ximén Pérez d'Arenós a privilege authorising him to move from the castle to a new unspecified place in the plains (plana). Tradition claims that the move was completed by the third Sunday of Lent, 1252.

During the Middle Ages, the city was protected by moats, walls and towers, and a church was built, later becoming a cathedral. Due to its geographic proximity to Valencia, the city prospered as a port. During the late medieval period, many members of the community participated in maritime trade, or in industries supporting the merchant community. During the late Middle Ages, the Jewish community of Castellón de la Plana maintained a synagogue and active communal life, but like many communities in Spain, it was dismantled following the 1492 expulsion.

In the 16th century the town was one of the last strongholds in the Revolta de les Germanies (local guilds). It also supported Archduke Charles of Austria in the War of the Spanish Succession (1701–14), but was later taken by the troops of Philip d'Anjou.

In the 19th century, the city walls were torn down and it slowly began to expand, a process interrupted by the War of Independence against Napoleon (1804–14) and the Carlist Wars (1833–63). In 1833 Castelló became the capital of the newly constituted province. In the second half of the 19th century, the city again began to expand, marked by the arrival of the railway, the enlargement of the port and the construction of representative buildings (Provincial Hospital, Casino, Theater) and parks.

In 1991 a university (Jaume I University) was established, set upon a modern campus. The local economy is based on industry, tourism and craft-work.

== Geography and climate ==
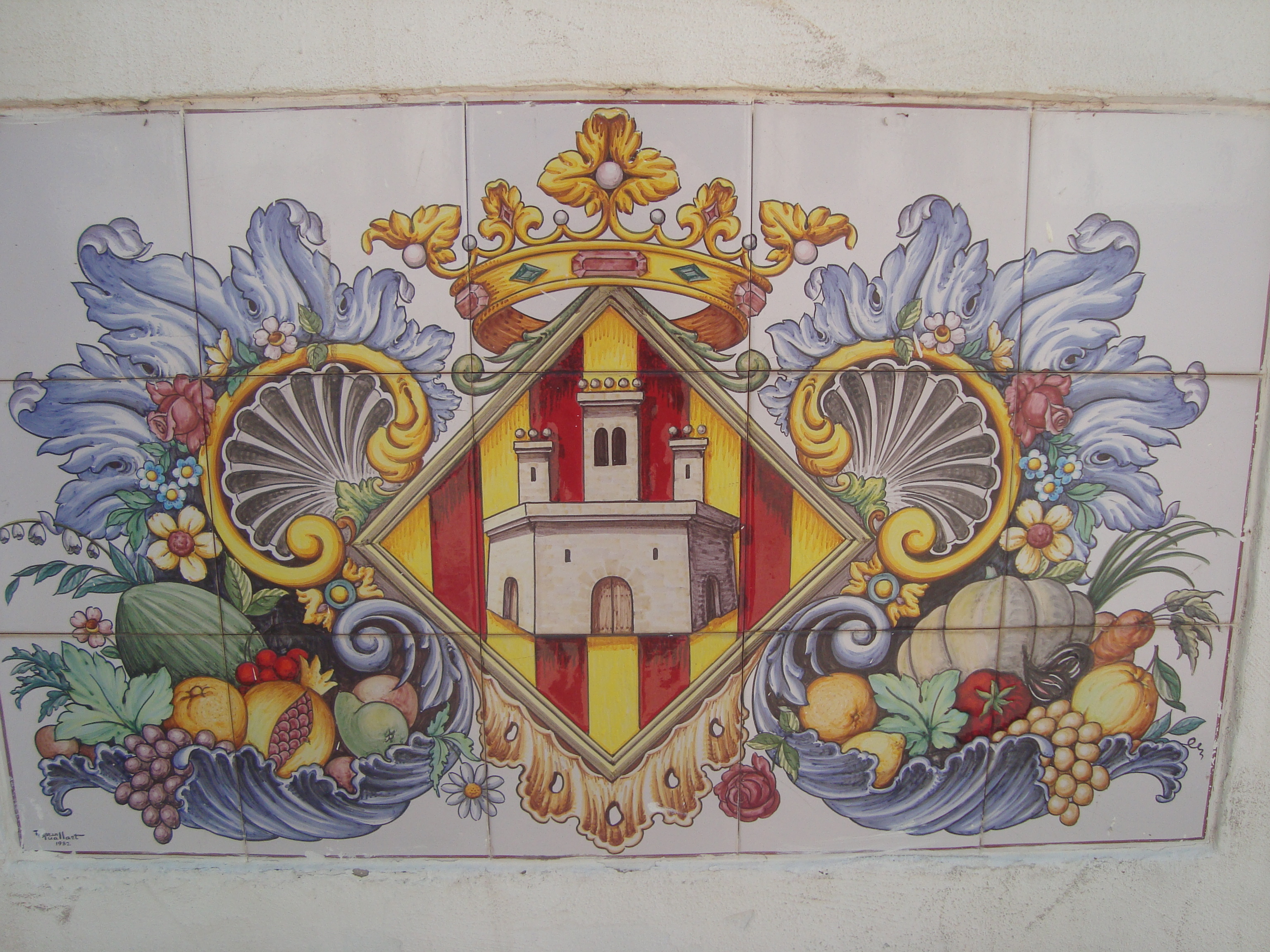
Coat of arms of Castellón de la Plana.

Castellón de la Plana has a hot semi-arid climate (Köppen: BSh) with mild winters and hot, dry, muggy summers with high humidity levels. Autumn is the wettest season and the average sunshine hours are around 2,800 per year. Annual rainfall reaches 435 mm, with significant changes throughout the year, with very marked minimums in summer and maximums in the autumn months due to the effect of the meteorological phenomenon of the cold drop, with a secondary maximum in spring.

Climate data for Castellón de la Plana, Almazora 43m (1991–2020), extremes (1976–present)
Month	Jan	Feb	Mar	Apr	May	Jun	Jul	Aug	Sep	Oct	Nov	Dec	Year
Record high °C (°F)	28.0 (82.4)	28.8 (83.8)	30.8 (87.4)	30.6 (87.1)	35.0 (95.0)	38.8 (101.8)	40.6 (105.1)	39.4 (102.9)	36.0 (96.8)	33.4 (92.1)	29.0 (84.2)	25.4 (77.7)	40.6 (105.1)
Mean daily maximum °C (°F)	15.6 (60.1)	16.4 (61.5)	18.7 (65.7)	21.0 (69.8)	24.1 (75.4)	27.9 (82.2)	30.4 (86.7)	30.7 (87.3)	27.8 (82.0)	23.9 (75.0)	19.1 (66.4)	16.1 (61.0)	22.6 (72.8)
Daily mean °C (°F)	11.0 (51.8)	11.7 (53.1)	13.8 (56.8)	16.0 (60.8)	19.3 (66.7)	23.1 (73.6)	25.8 (78.4)	26.2 (79.2)	23.2 (73.8)	19.4 (66.9)	14.7 (58.5)	11.8 (53.2)	18.0 (64.4)
Mean daily minimum °C (°F)	6.4 (43.5)	6.9 (44.4)	8.9 (48.0)	11.0 (51.8)	14.4 (57.9)	18.3 (64.9)	21.2 (70.2)	21.6 (70.9)	18.6 (65.5)	15.0 (59.0)	10.2 (50.4)	7.5 (45.5)	13.3 (56.0)
Record low °C (°F)	−4.4 (24.1)	−2.2 (28.0)	0.4 (32.7)	2.8 (37.0)	5.2 (41.4)	10.2 (50.4)	12.0 (53.6)	12.2 (54.0)	9.8 (49.6)	5.4 (41.7)	−1.8 (28.8)	−0.6 (30.9)	−4.4 (24.1)
Average precipitation mm (inches)	38 (1.5)	26 (1.0)	45 (1.8)	34 (1.3)	36 (1.4)	19 (0.7)	10 (0.4)	20 (0.8)	60 (2.4)	54 (2.1)	53 (2.1)	40 (1.6)	435 (17.1)
Average precipitation days (≥ 1 mm)	3.6	3.1	3.7	4.2	4.3	2.6	1.7	2.5	4.8	4.4	4.1	4.0	43
Average relative humidity (%)	64	62	62	60	60	59	61	64	65	67	64	66	63
Mean monthly sunshine hours	183	192	226	252	291	318	341	301	240	217	183	170	2,914
Percentage possible sunshine	61	63	61	63	65	71	75	71	64	63	61	58	65
Source: Agencia Estatal de Meteorología

== Main sights ==
Most of the historical buildings are located in the diminutive old town, around the Plaça Major (Main Square). These include:

- The Concatedral de Santa Maria (co-cathedral of Saint Mary), built in a Gothic-style in the 13th century and reconstructed one century later after destruction by fire. The present building is another reconstruction after the demolition ordered by the council during the Spanish civil war (1936).
- The Ajuntament (City Hall), erected at the beginning of the 18th century. It features a Tuscan-style façade rising up over a colonnade.
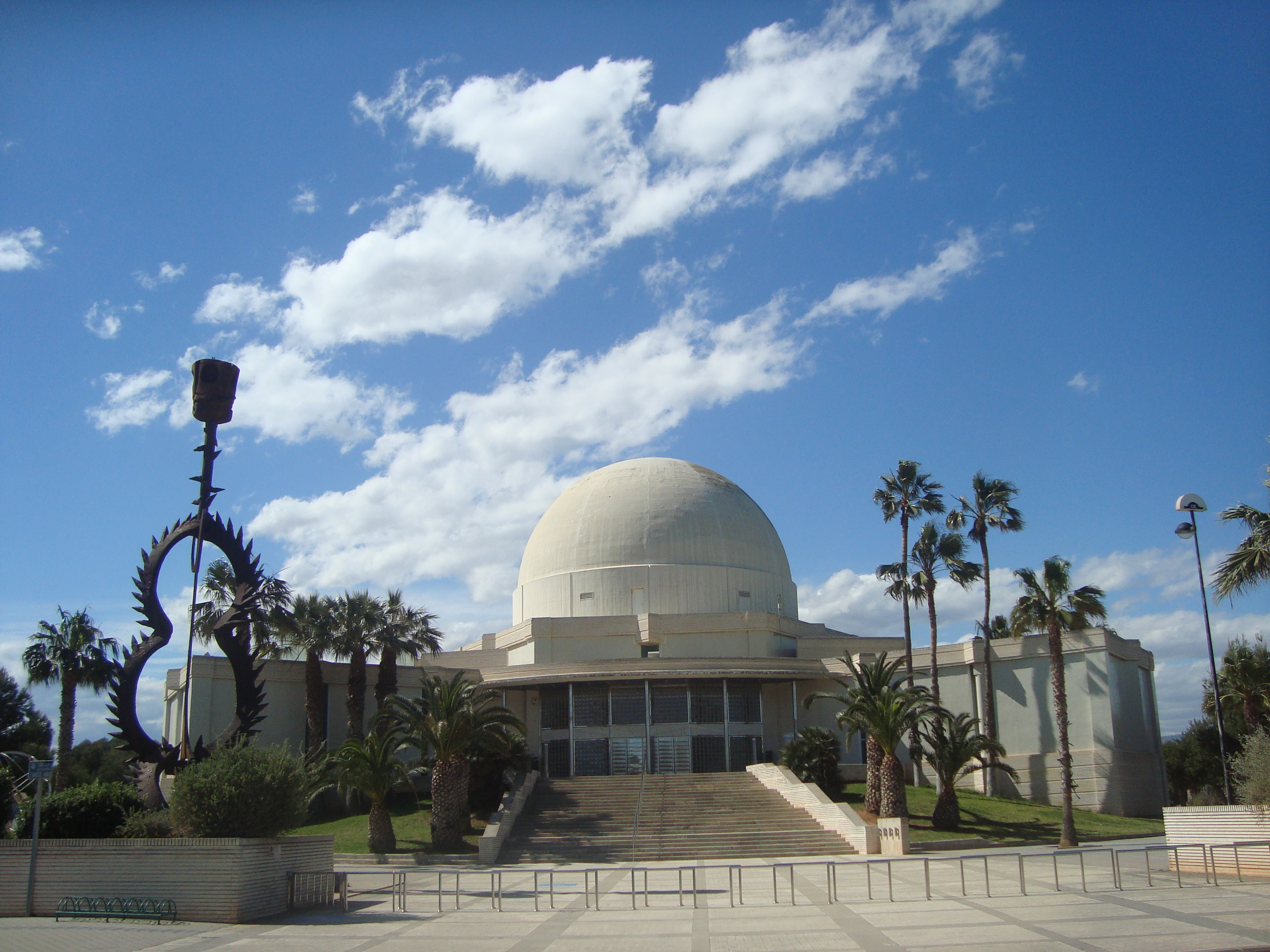
- Planetario de Castellón
  The free-standing bell-tower of the procathedral, known as El Fadrí (the single man), built in the 15th century.
- The Llotja del Cànem (Hemp Exchange Market), built during the first half of the 17th century to be used by traders in hempen cloth and ropes, a very important activity in the area at the time. Today the building is used by the university for cultural events and temporary exhibitions.
- On the northeast edge of the town, at the end of a broad avenue decorated with orange trees, stands the Basílica of Santa Maria del Lledó (European Hackberry or Celtis australis), a basilica devoted to an image of the Virgin Mary found in 1366 by a farmer when he was ploughing his lands. The original 14th-century chapel was extended to its present Baroque form during the 16th century.
- Espai d'Art Contemporani de Castelló, Museum for Modern Art
- Teatre Principal

== Events ==
The celebration of the city's founding, known as the Magdalena Festivities, is the main festival of the city. Lasting a week, it takes place three weeks before Easter. It commemorates the founding of the city when the inhabitants of the mountain areas moved down to the plains with the authorization of James I. The most notable event is the Romería de las Cañas, a pilgrimage to the Hermitage of La Magdalena. The most striking symbol of these celebrations is the Gaiatas—mobile structures that recreate the lanterns used by the first settlers—built by different associations, each representing a neighborhood and also called Gaiatas.

== Sports ==
The city has the professional basketball team AB Castelló, which plays in LEB Oro, Spanish second basketball division.

The local professional football club is CD Castellón, which currently plays in the Segunda División (Spanish second division). It holds home games at Nou Estadi Castàlia, which has a capacity of 15,500 seats. Despite its stadium and social support, the club financial problems and unstable history brought it to play in semi-pro and amateur regional divisions, not playing in La Liga since the 1990–91 season. On 21 March 2018, Castellón beat the record of seasonal tickets in the fourth-tier division with 12,701, and is considered a giant amongst minnows. The presence of Villarreal CF in the adjacent town (only 8 km away) has created a fierce rivalry for geographical reasons, especially due to the success of Villarreal in the last decades.

The city is host to futsal club CFS Bisontes Castellón, which under the name Playas de Castellón was one of the best Spanish and European futsal clubs in the late 90s and early 2000s, having won the premier professional futsal league in Spain twice in 2000 and 2001, and the UEFA Futsal Cup three consecutive times in 2001, 2002 and 2003.

== Education ==
Jaume I University was founded in 1991, and in 2014 there were approximately 15,000 students enrolled who share a single campus.

== Twin towns ==
- Châtellerault, France
- Târgoviște, Romania
- Ube, Japan
- Lleida, Spain

== Notable people ==
- Pierre Méchain (born 1744), mathematician and astronomer.
- Sergio Aragonés (born 1937), comics cartoonist.
- José Luis Ballester (born 1969), Olympic butterfly swimmer.
- Joan Barreda Bort (born 1983), Rally raid motorcyclist.
- Roberto Bautista-Agut (born 1988), professional tennis player.
- María Egual (1655–1735), poet and dramatist.
- Pablo Fornals (born 1996), professional footballer for West Ham United.
- Sergio García (born 1980), professional golfer.
- Pablo Hernandez Dominguez (born 1985), footballer, formerly with Valencia CF.
- Pablo Herrera (beach volleyball) (born 1982), beach volleyball player, six-time Olympian.
- Roberto Merhi, (born 1991), racing driver.
- José Manuel Pérez-Aicart (born 1982), racing driver.
- Félix Porteiro (born 1983), racing driver.
- Matilde Salvador (1918–2007), musician, composer and painter artist.
- Miguel Angel Silvestre, (born 1982), actor.
- Xavi Valero (born 1973), professional football goalkeeping coach.
- Carlos Fabra Carreras (born 1945), politician

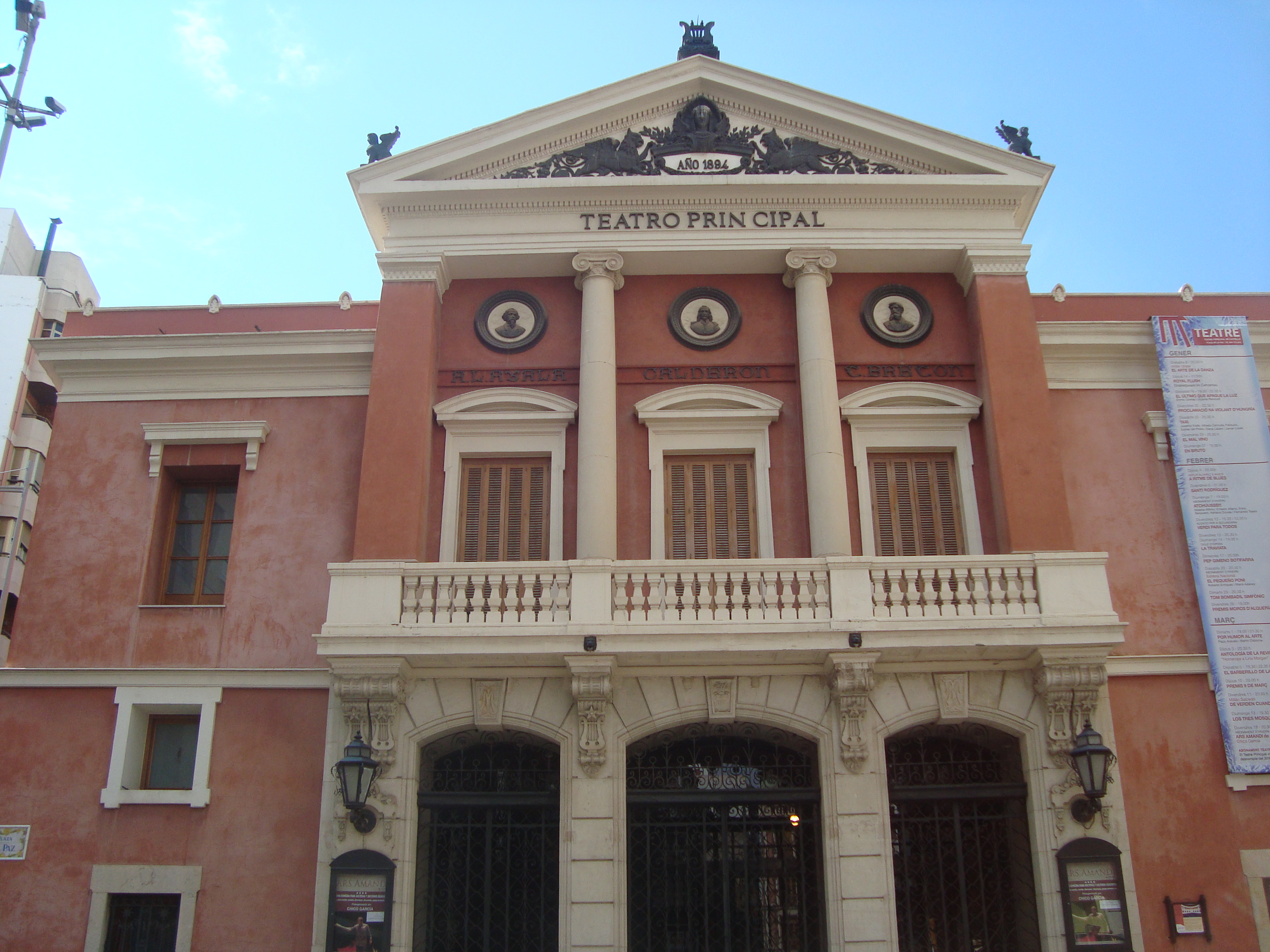
Teatro Principal (Castellón de la Plana)

== Transport ==
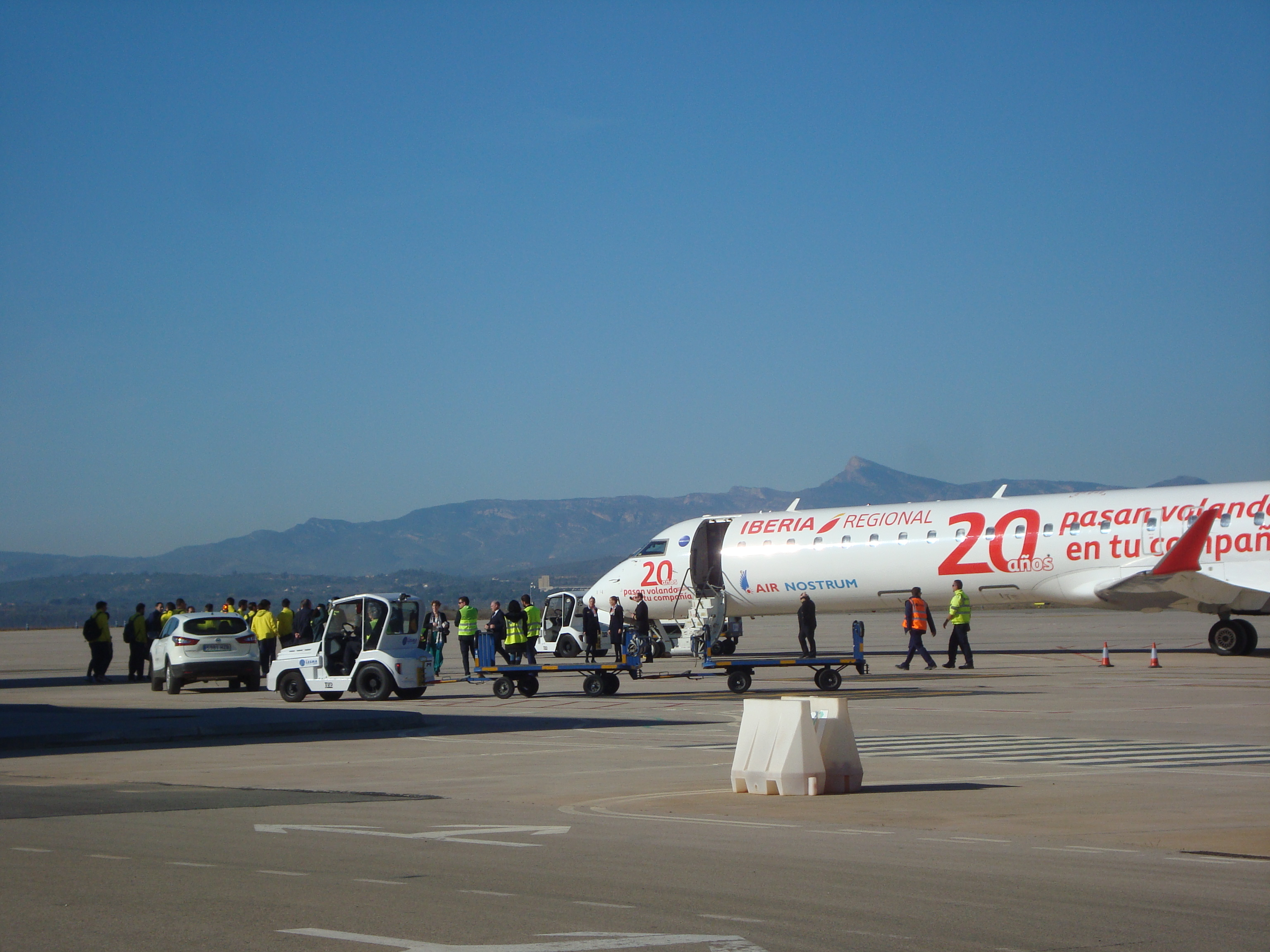
Castellón-Costa Azahar Airport

The small Castellón Airport offers charter and general aviation services, as well as scheduled passenger services to London, Bucharest and Poznań. The new Castellón-Costa Azahar Airport is designed to support large international jet flights and was completed in 2011. It has become a symbol of the wasteful spending prior to the 2008–13 Spanish financial crisis. Valencia Airport is about 70 km (43 mi) south whilst Alicante Airport is another 185 km (115 mi) further down the coast.

The city is served by the Castellón de la Plana railway station. The Euromed railway line links Alicante to Barcelona.

Since 2008, the city has been served by a trolleybus system, which is branded as the TRAM.

== See also ==
- Diocese of Segorbe-Castellón
- Columbretes Islands
- List of municipalities in Castellón
