= Castelló Co-Cathedral =

Catholic Co-Cathedral in Castelló de la Plana, Spain

- Co-Cathedral of Saint Mary
- Concatedral de Santa María
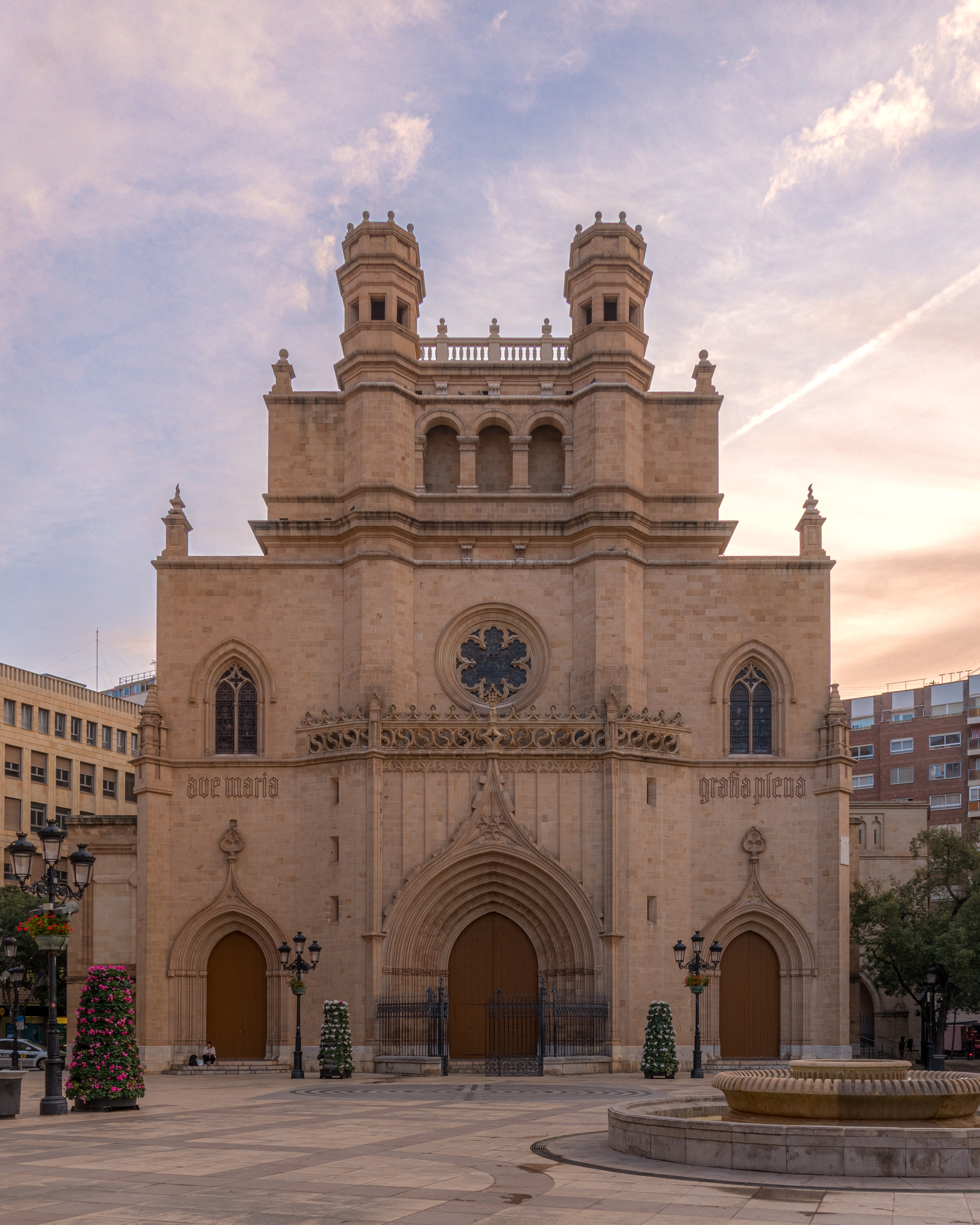
- West façade at dawn.
- Castelló Co-Cathedral
- 39.986°N 0.037°W
- Location: Castelló de la Plana
- Address: 9, Plaça Major
- Country: Spain
- Denomination: Catholic
- Website: concatedral.com

History
- Status: Cathedral
- Dedication: Mary, mother of Jesus

Architecture
- Architect: Vincente Traver Tomás
- Style: Gothic Revival

Administration
- Metropolis: Valencia
- Diocese: Segorbe-Castellón

Clergy
- Bishop: Casimiro López Llorente

Spanish Cultural Heritage
- Type: Non-movable
- Criteria: Monument
- Designated: 3 June 1931
- Reference no.: RI-51-0000509

The Co-cathedral of Saint Mary (Valencian: Cocatedral de Santa Maria, Spanish: Concatedral de Santa María) is the cathedral of Castelló de la Plana, located in the comarca of Plana Alta, in the Valencian Community, Spain.
