= Cream (disambiguation) =

Cream is a dairy product.

Cream may also refer to:

== Art, entertainment, and media ==
=== Music ===
- Cream (band), 1960s British rock supergroup
- Cream (Japanese group), Japanese hip hop group
- Cream (rapper) (born 1990), South Korean musician
- The Cream (album), a 1978 live album by John Lee Hooker
- "Cream" (Blank & Jones song), 1999
- "Cream" (Prince song), with the New Power Generation
- "C.R.E.A.M." (1993), "Cash Rules Everything Around Me" by the Wu-Tang Clan
- Cream (album), by Sandra Collins

=== Fictional characters ===
- Cream the Rabbit, a Sonic the Hedgehog character
- Cream, character in The Adventures of Cookie & Cream
- Cream, the stand of major antagonist Vanilla Ice in JoJo's Bizarre Adventure: Stardust Crusaders

=== Film ===
- Cream (film), 2014 British film
- Cream (short film), 2017 British short film

=== Periodicals ===
- Creem, American music magazine
- Creme (magazine), New Zealand magazine for girls

== Food and drink ==
- Coconut cream, a common ingredient in curries
- Cream ale, a type of beer
- Cream soda (disambiguation)
- Creamed corn

=== Fillings or toppings ===
- Bavarian cream
- Buttercream
- Chiboust cream
- Crema (dairy product)
- Crème anglaise
- Crème fraîche
- Custard
- Custard cream
- Sour cream
- Whipped cream (also called Chantilly cream)
- Clotted cream

== Places ==
- Cream (nightclub), Liverpool, England
- Cream, Wisconsin, United States
- Cream Ridge, New Jersey, United States
- Cream City, Ohio, United States

== Topical substances ==
- Cream (pharmacy), a preparation applied to a body surface
- Cold cream, a substance to smooth skin and remove make-up
- The cream, a testosterone-based ointment used to mask steroid use
- Aqueous cream, a light, hydrocarbon-based emulsion
- Anti-aging cream
- Barrier cream
- CC cream

== People ==
- Claudia Cream, Australian lawyer and community advocate
- Matthew Cream (born 1975), Australian football referee
- Thomas Neill Cream (1850–1892), a Scottish-Canadian medical doctor and serial killer, thought to have murdered up to ten people in Canada, the United Kingdom, and the United States

== Other uses ==
- Cream (colour)
- Cream gene, an equine dilution gene
- Cream of the crop (disambiguation)
- Crème de la crème (disambiguation)
- Cosmic Ray Energetics and Mass (CREAM), a series of cosmic ray experiments
- Slang term for ejaculate or ejaculation (See also cream pie)

== See also ==
- Crème (disambiguation)
- Crema (disambiguation)
- Creaming (disambiguation)
