= The Cream =

The Cream may refer to:

- The Cream, the initial name for Cream (band), a British rock band
- The Cream (album), a live album by John Lee Hooker

== See also ==
- Cream (disambiguation)
