= Effigy =

Representation of a person through art

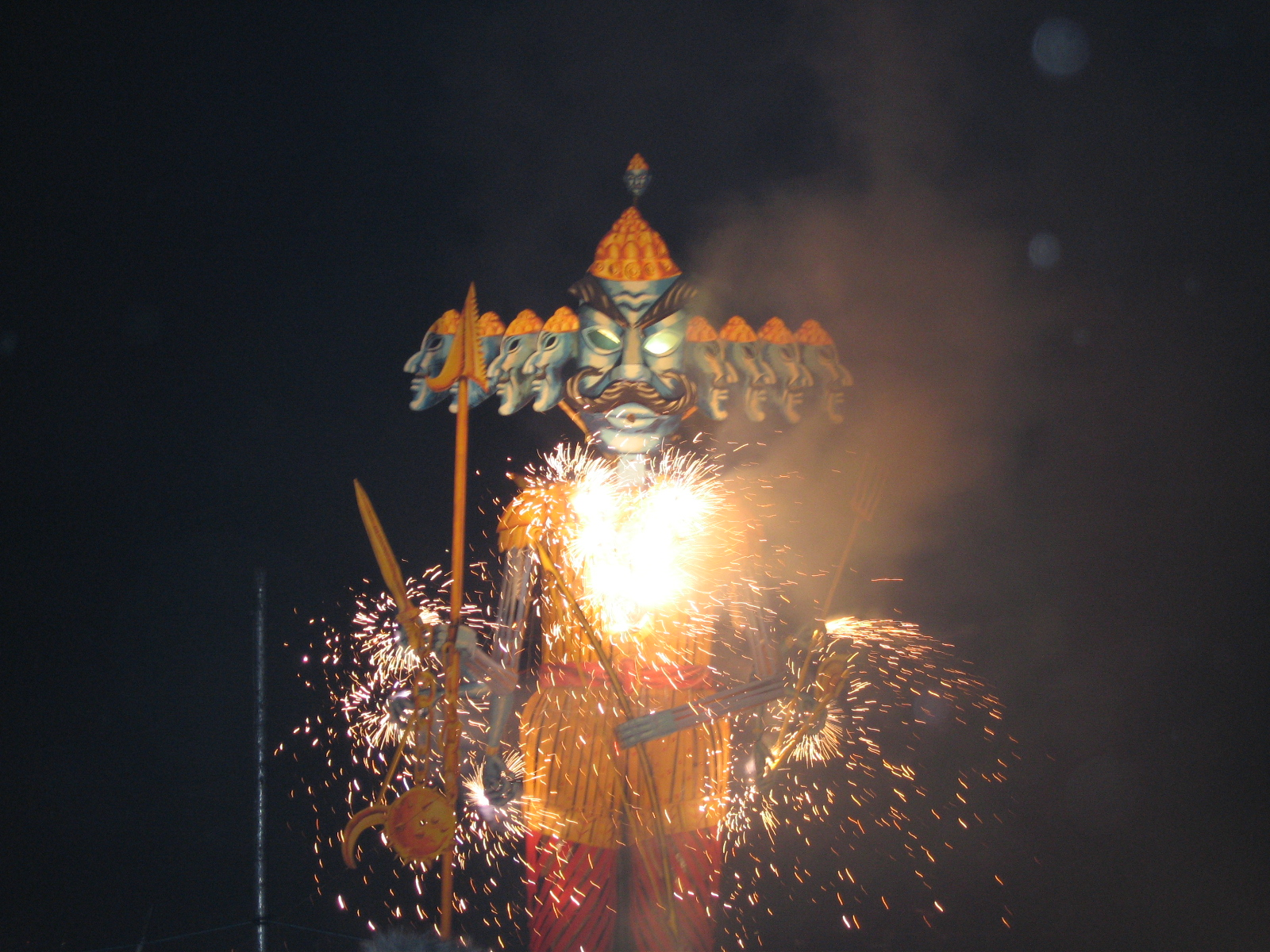
Effigy of Ravana, a figure from the Ramayana, with burning sparklers, in Manchester, England, in 2006

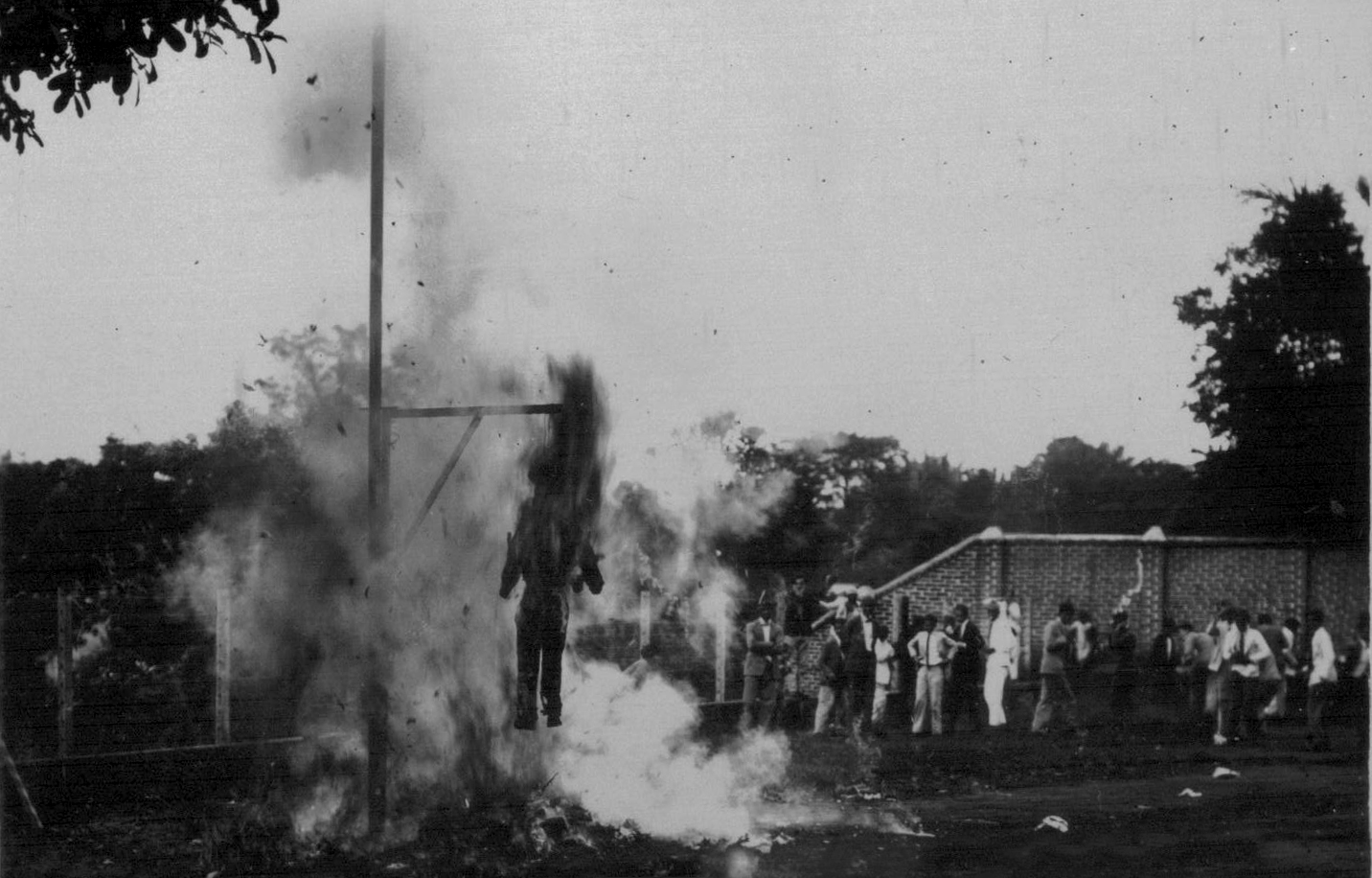
Burning of Judas Iscariot, Brazil, 1909

An effigy is a sculptural representation, often life-size, of a specific person or a prototypical figure. The term is mostly used for the makeshift dummies used for symbolic punishment in political protests and for the figures burned in certain traditions around New Year, Carnival, and Easter. In European cultures, effigies were used in the past for punishment in formal justice when the perpetrator could not be apprehended, and in popular justice practices of social shaming and exclusion. Additionally, "effigy" is used for certain traditional forms of sculpture, namely tomb effigies, funeral effigies and coin effigies.

There is a large overlap and exchange between the ephemeral forms of effigies. Traditional holiday effigies are often politically charged, for instance, when the generalised figures Año Viejo (the Old Year) or Judas in Latin America are substituted by the effigy of a despised politician. Traditional forms are also borrowed for political protests. In India, for instance, effigies in protests regularly take the form of the ten-headed demon king Ravana, as they figure in the traditional Ramlila. In Mexico and the United States piñatas depicting a politician are sometimes taken to protests and beaten to a pulp. Procedures of formal and popular justice are appropriated when the effigy of a politician in a protest figures in a mock trial, mock execution and mock funeral.

In all cases, except the traditional effigies, there is an emphasis on the social and political aspects of the depicted person. Tomb effigies and funeral effigies exhibit attire and office insignia that indicate social status; coin effigies are signs of sovereignty; formal punishment of an effigy was synonymous to social death; popular punishment was meant to humiliate and ostracise the depicted; effigies in political protests ridicule and attack the honour of the targeted politician.

== Etymology ==
The word efigy is first documented in English in 1539 and comes, perhaps via French, from the Latin singular form effigies, meaning "copy, image, likeness, portrait, and statue". This spelling was originally used in English for singular senses: even a single image was "the effigies of ...". (This spelling seems to have been later reanalyzed as a plural, creating the singular effigy.) In effigie was probably understood as a Latin phrase until the 18th century. The word occurs in Shakespeare's As You Like It of 1600 (II, vii, 193), where scansion suggests that the second syllable is to be emphasized, as in the Latin pronunciation (but unlike the modern English pronunciation).

== Political effigies ==
Hanging or burning the effigy of a political enemy to ridicule and dishonour them is a very old and very widespread practice. It is reported that in 1328, the troops of Holy Roman Emperor Louis IV, on their campaign in Italy to unseat Pope John XXII, burned a straw puppet of the pope. Burning effigies in political protests is especially widespread in India and Pakistan. In the Philippines, the practice came up during the successful People Power Revolution against the regime of President Marcos. Since then effigy protests against the successive presidents developed into elaborate spectacles. US President George W. Bush and President Barack Obama have been burned in effigy numerous times in protests against military operations and occupations of Afghanistan and Iraq in the countries in the region as well as elsewhere. During the Arab Spring of 2011 and onward, effigies of the countries' leaders have been hanged in Egypt, Libya, Yemen and Syria.

In the British colonies in New England, effigy performances gained prominence as an effective tool in the protests against the 1765 Stamp Act, leading to the American Revolution and the founding of the United States of America. Afterwards, it became an established form of political expression in US politics, and almost every US President has been burned in effigy at some point in his career.

The best known British example of a political effigy is the figure of Guy Fawkes, one of the conspirators in the Gunpowder Plot who tried to assassinate King James I in 1605 by blowing up the House of Lords. Already a year later, the 5th of November was declared a holiday to celebrate the survival of the king and was celebrated with bonfires. Soon after, effigies of Guy Fawkes were burned. Traditionally, children make effigies from old clothing filled with straw to beg for "a penny for the guy", and communities build their own bonfires. Currently, Lewes, on the south coast of England has the most elaborate celebrations of Guy Fawkes Night. Competing bonfire societies make effigies of important and unpopular figures in current affairs and burn them alongside effigies of Guy Fawkes and the Pope.

In Port Said, Egypt, the al-Limby (formerly known as Allenby) is burned during Spring Festival. The tradition started after the First World War, when demonstrators burned an effigy of British High Commissioner for Egypt Lord Allenby during a protest against the presence of British troops in the city. In the second half of the 20th century it became custom to portray contemporary enemies of Egypt as the al-Limby. During the Arab Spring, effigies of President Mubarak and other Egyptian politicians were exhibited and burned as the al-Limby.

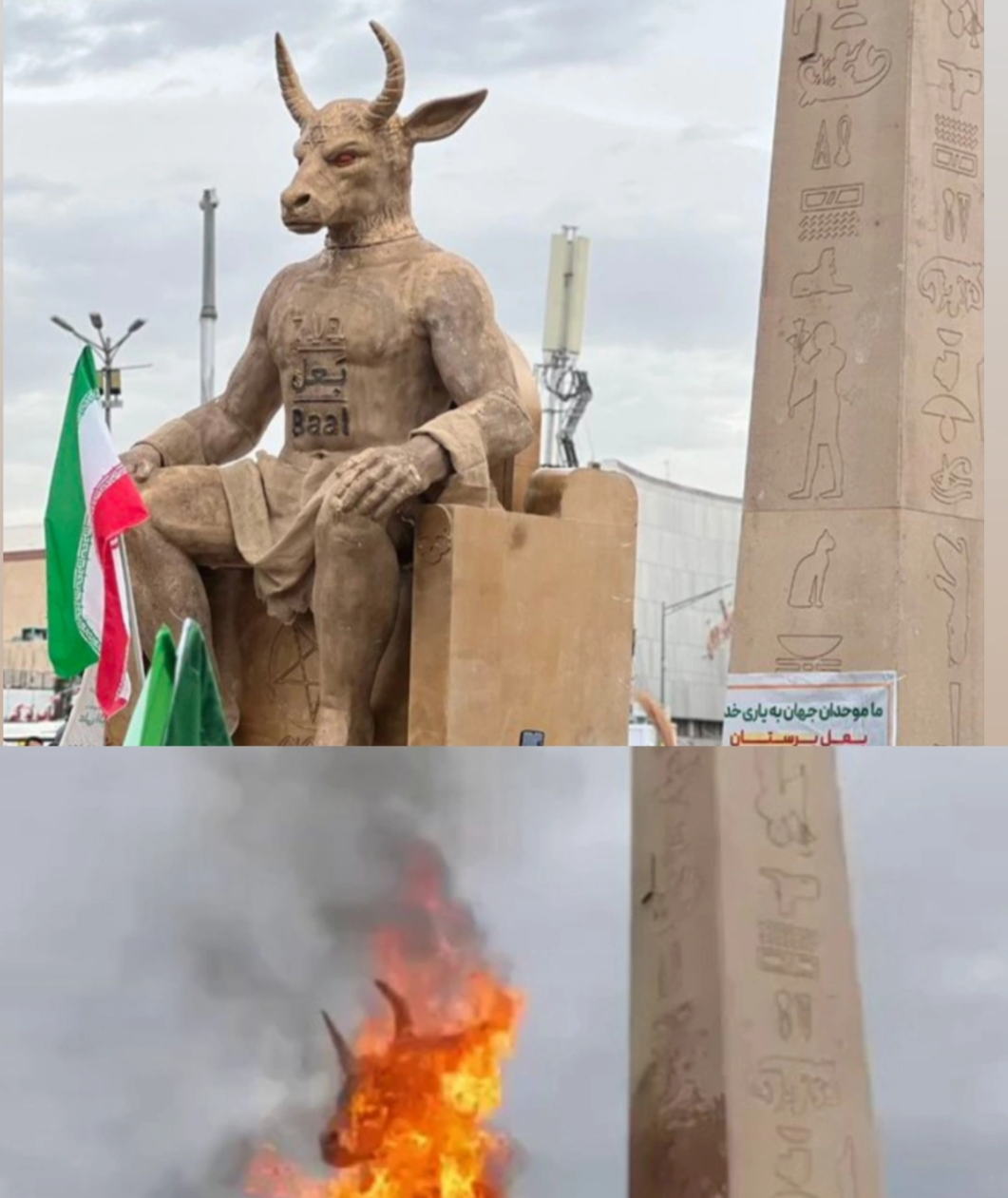
Burning Effigy of Baal in Iran

On 11 February 2026 (22 Bahman 1404 in persian calendar), in Iran during the celebrations of the 47th anniversary of the Iranian Revolution, an Effigy of Baal representing the demon gods and their worshippers was set to fire. The words were said before performing the act:

“We, the monotheists of the world, by the help of God, will bring down the worshipers of Baal, the worshipers of Satan, and the arrogant oppressors.”

== Traditional effigies ==
Burning effigies is part of many rituals to mark the change of the seasons, performed all over Europe in locally distinct traditions. The figures usually personify adverse forces of life (winter, the old year, the witch, Judas Iscariot) and their burning marks and celebrates the annual cycle of life—death and rebirth, the defeat of winter and the return of spring. Most traditions are staged around New Year, at the end of Carnival or in the week before Easter.

Many of these traditions have been exported as people migrated to other countries. European settlers brought their traditions to the colonies, where they might have merged with local traditions. In countries of Latin America, the Spanish tradition of burning Año Viejo (the Old Year) on New Year Eve and Judas on Good Friday is widely practiced. Judas is also burned in the Philippines. In Mexico, a hard papier-mache figure depicting the devil was used—representing Judas after he betrayed Jesus; and the figure wasn't just burned, but was blown to bits in the course of a fireworks display.

The tradition of burning Guy Fawkes has been brought to New England, Canada, Australia, New Zealand and other British colonies.

In 1971, professors at Lake Superior State University created a campus club called the Unicorn Hunters, which established a new tradition of burning a snowman on the first day of spring. The inspiration for the tradition is described on the university's website:

The burning takes its inspiration from the Rose Sunday Festival in Weinheim-an-der-Bergstrasse, Germany. In the festival, a parade passes through town to a central location, where the mayor makes a proposal to the town’s children. If the children are good, study, obey their parents and work hard, he will order the (straw) snowman to be burned, and spring will officially arrive. After the children yell their approval and make their promise, the snowman is burned.

The Marzanna ritual represents the end of the dark days of winter, the victory over death, and the welcoming of the spring rebirth. Marzanna is a Slavic goddess of death, associated with winter. The rite involves burning a female straw effigy or drowning it in a river, or both. It is a folk custom in Poland, Slovakia and the Czech Republic, taking place on the day of the vernal equinox.

== Funeral effigies ==
Funeral effigies made from wood, cloth and wax played a role in the royal funeral rituals in early modern France and England. Following the medieval European doctrine of the double body of the king, these effigies represented the immortal and divine kingship. The effigy was dressed in the royal regalia and waited upon as if alive, while the monarch's physical remains remained hidden in the coffin. After the coronation of the new king, these effigies were stored away. The museum of Westminster Abbey has a collection of English royal wax effigies reaching back to Edward III of England, who died in 1377. In the 18th century also other important personalities were honoured with a funeral effigy, for instance British prime minister Pitt the Elder, the naval hero Horatio Nelson, French emperor Napoleon, and Frances Stewart, Duchess of Richmond, who also had her parrot stuffed and displayed at her own request and expense.

From the time of the funeral of Charles II in 1685, effigies were no longer placed on the coffin but were still made for later display. The effigy of Charles II was displayed over his tomb until the early 19th century, when all effigies were removed from the abbey. Nelson's effigy was a tourist attraction, commissioned the year after his death and his burial in St Paul's Cathedral in 1805. The government had decided that major public figures with State funerals should in future be buried at St Paul's. Concerned for their revenue from visitors, the Abbey decided it needed a rival attraction for admirers of Nelson.

== Tomb effigies ==
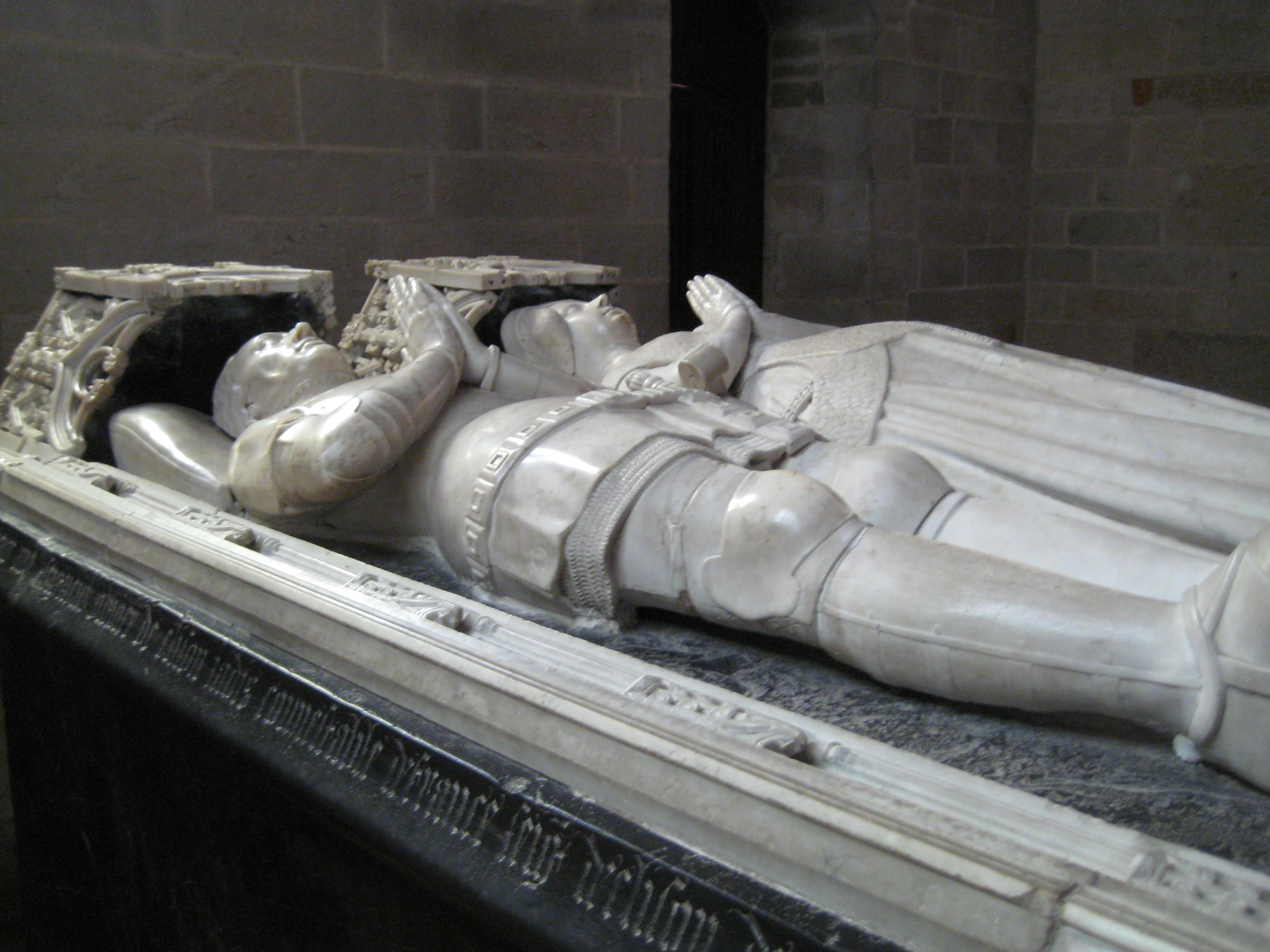
Double tomb effigies or gisants, Josselin, Brittany, France; 15th century

A tomb effigy, in French gisant ("recumbent") is the usually life-size sculpted figure depicting the deceased on a tomb monument. Although these funerary and commemorative reliefs were first developed in Ancient Egyptian and Etruscan cultures, they appear most numerously in Western Europe tombs from the later 11th century, in a style that continued in use through the Renaissance and early modern period, and are still sometimes used. They typically represent the deceased in a state of "eternal repose", with hands folded in prayer, lying on a pillow, awaiting resurrection with a dog or lion at their feet. A husband and wife may be depicted lying side by side.

A related type of tomb effigy, the cadaver monument, shows the corpse in a state of decomposition as a reminder of human mortality.

== On coins ==
In the field of numismatics, an effigy is the portrait of a person, usually a ruler or a monarch, on the obverse of a coin, the obverse being the side of the coin commonly called heads. A practice evident in reference literature of the 19th century, the obverse of a coin was said to depict "the ruler's effigy". The appearance and style of effigy used varies according to the preference of the monarch or ruler being depicted – for example, some, such as George VI of the United Kingdom have preferred to be shown uncrowned, while others have favoured highly-formal representations. It can also be the case that the monarch's reign becomes long enough to merit issuing a succession of effigies so that their appearance continues to be current. Such has been the case for Queen Victoria (three effigies over 63 years) and Elizabeth II, who was depicted by five different effigies on British coins and three different effigies on British postage stamps between her ascension to the throne in 1953 and her death in 2022.

== Other types ==
Effigy mound is a term used in the archaeology of (mainly) Pre-Columbian America for a large earthwork in the shape of a stylized animal, symbol, human, or other figure and generally containing one or more human burials.

Effigy vessel is a term used in the archeology of (mainly) Pre-Columbian America for ceramic or stone containers, pots, vases, cups, etc., in the shape of an animal or human.

In the past, criminals sentenced to death in absentia might be officially executed "in effigy" as a symbolic act. In southern India, effigies of the demon-king Ravana from the epic poem the Ramayana are traditionally burnt during the festival of Navrati.

A wicker man was a large human-shaped wicker statue allegedly used in Celtic paganism for human sacrifice by burning it, when loaded with captives.

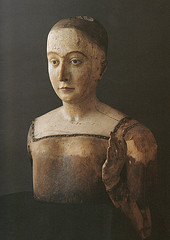
The funeral effigy of Elizabeth of York, mother of King Henry VIII, wax, 1503, Westminster Abbey

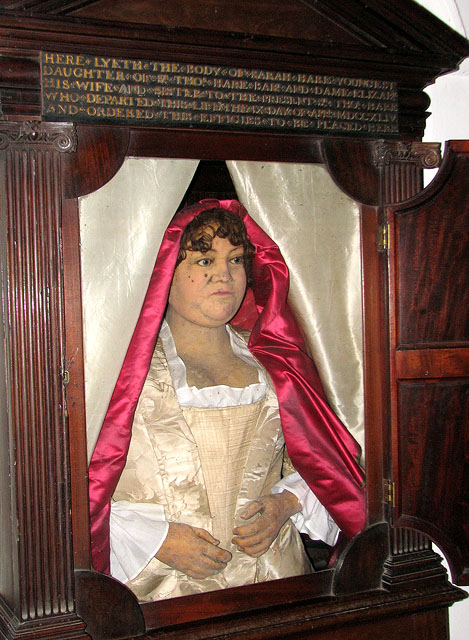
A rare wax funerary effigy of a private person, who stipulated it be made in her will, England, 1744. Holy Trinity Church, Stow Bardolph, Norfolk.

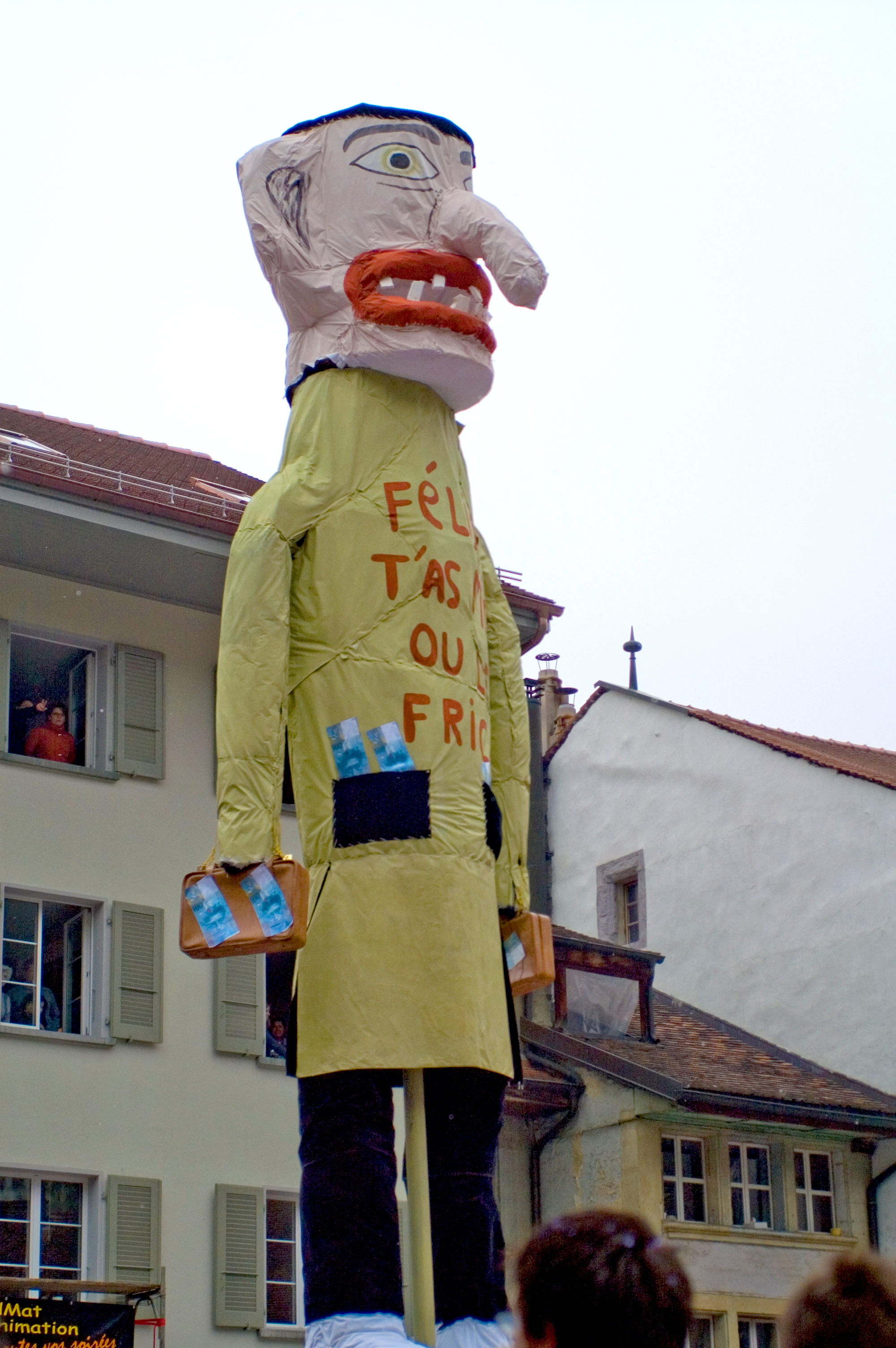
"Grand Rababou" (from the French word rababouêt, 'voleur de bois', poor wood thief) depicted here with the classic antisemitic stereotypes of hooked nose, bags and suitcases full of money is burnt annually in the Carnaval des Bolzes of Fribourg, Switzerland

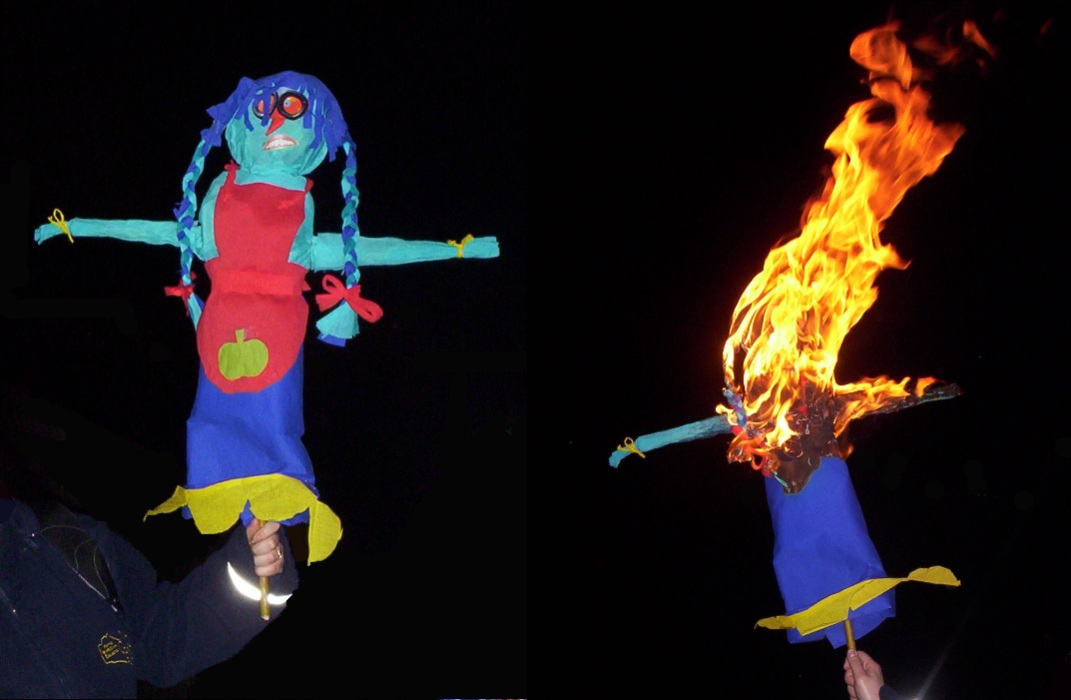
Modern Marzanna (goddess) effigy, Poland

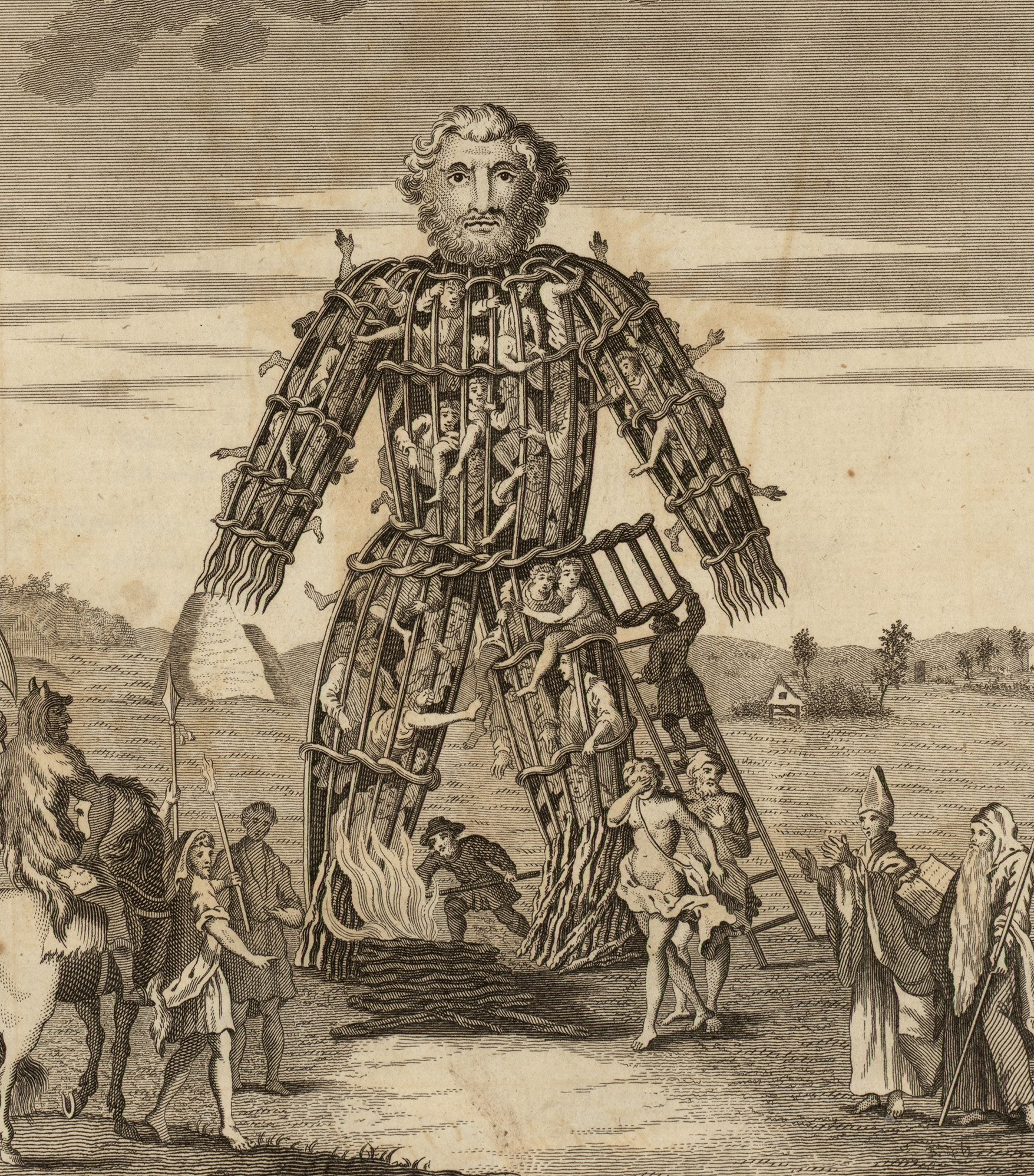
An 18th-century engraving of a Celtic wicker man, ready for burning

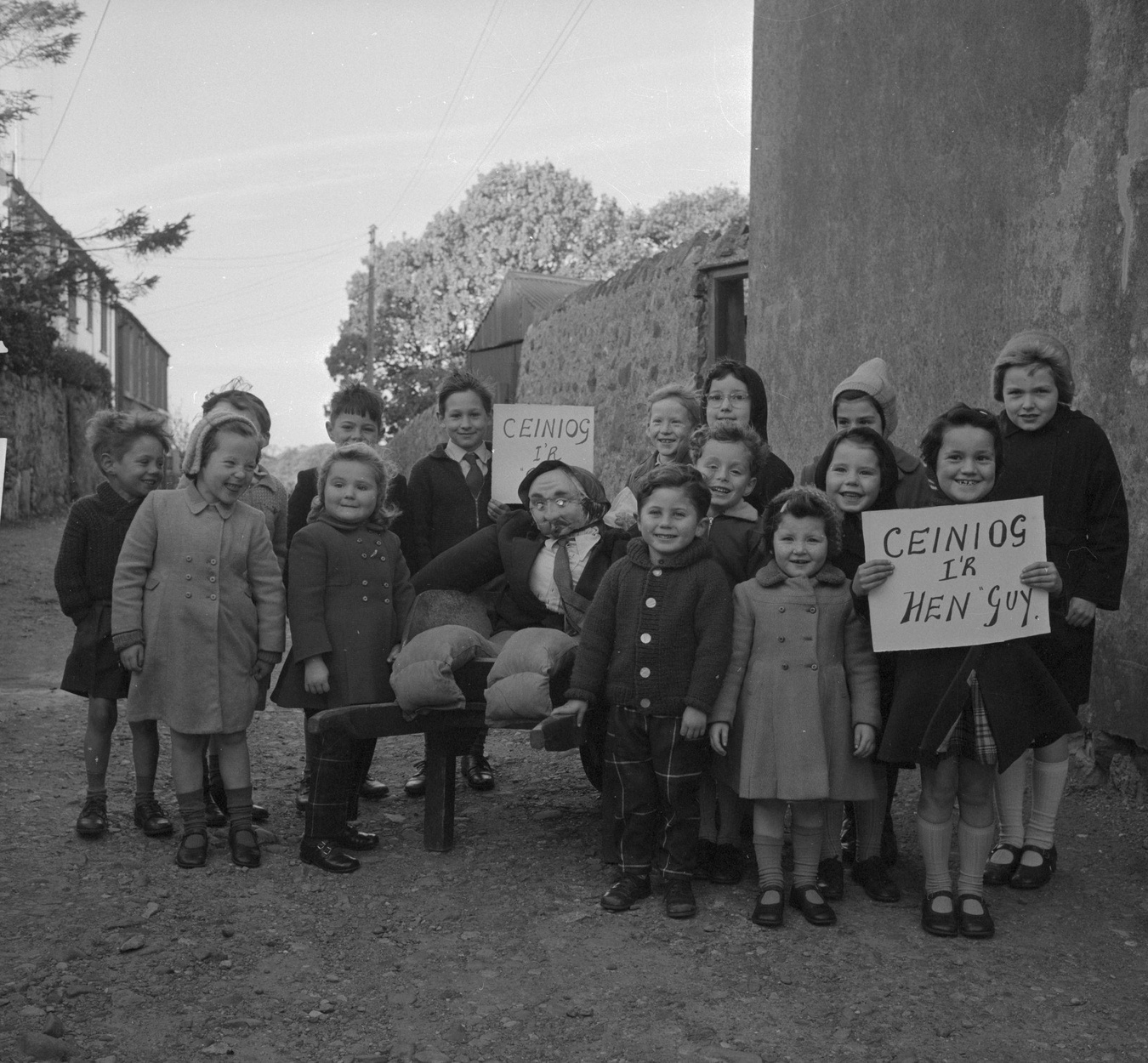
Welsh children with their Guy Fawkes effigy in November 1962. The sign reads "Penny for the Guy".

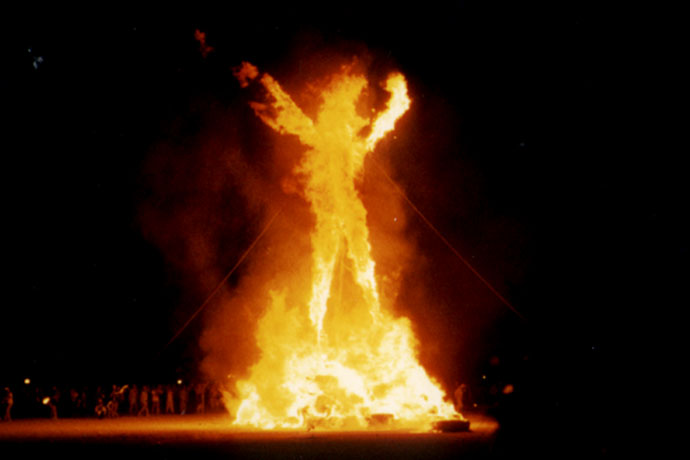
Every year The Man is burned at the Burning Man festival, Nevada

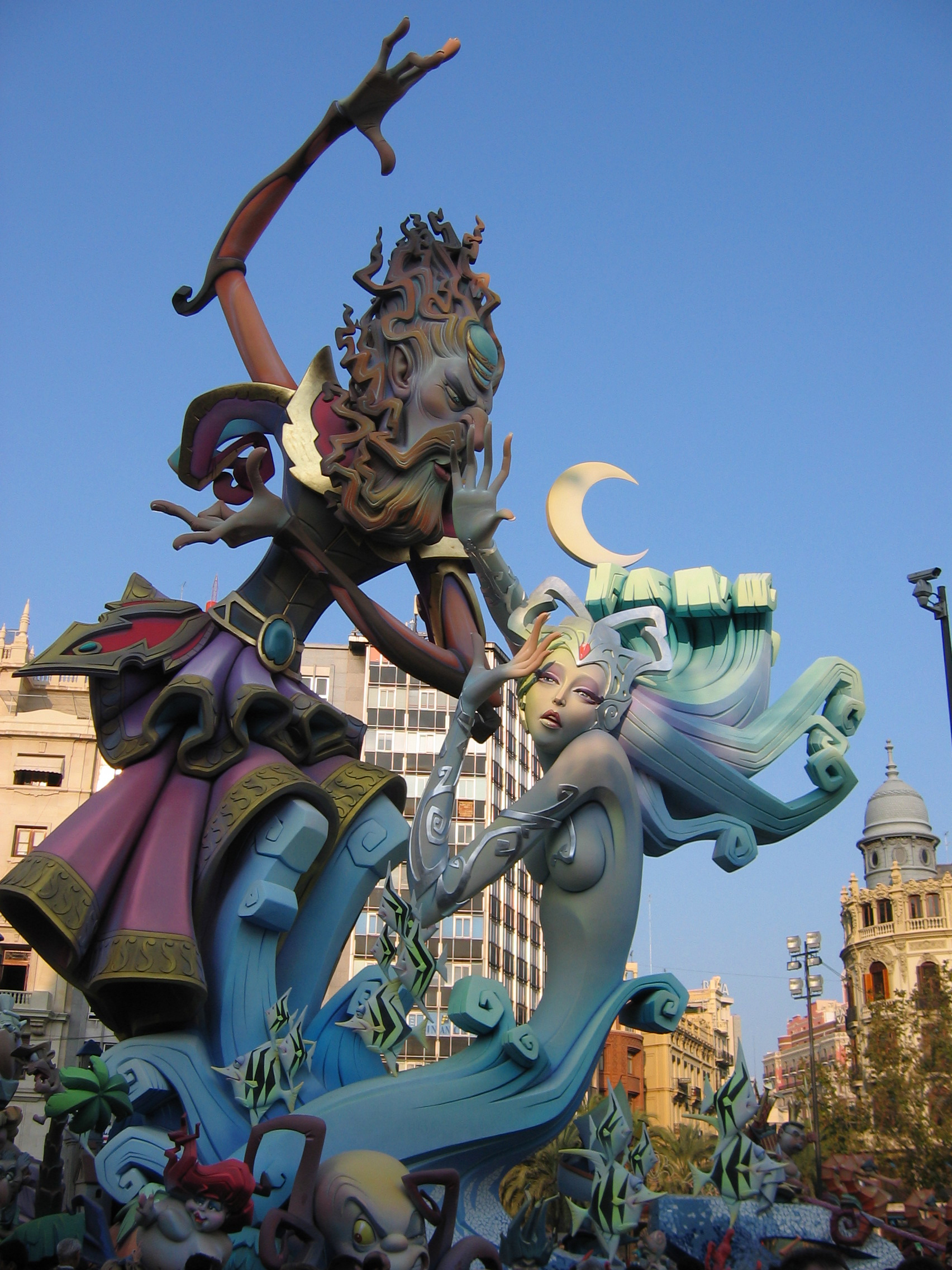
Falla monument for the Fallas festival in Valencia, Spain

== See also ==
- Cult image
- Voodoo doll
- Poppet
- Burning Man
- Madame Tussauds
- Flag burning
- Death mask
- Anathema

== Sources ==
- Bass, Marisa Anne. "The transi tomb and the genius of sixteenth century Netherlandish funerary sculpture". Netherlands Yearbook for the History of Art, volume 67, 2017. JSTOR 26593102
- Fozi, Shirin. Romanesque Tomb Effigies: Death and Redemption in Medieval Europe, 1000–1200. University Park (PA): Penn State University Press, 2021. ISBN 978-0-2710-8917-1
