= List of Oreo varieties =

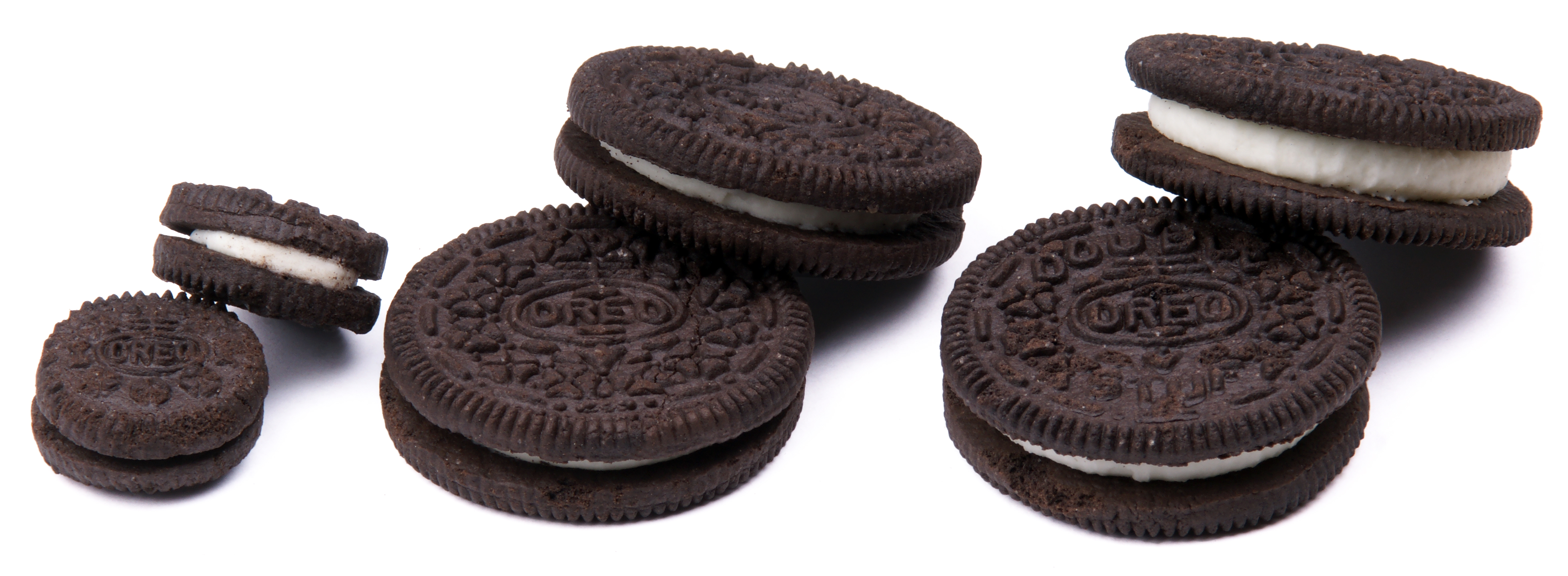
Different sizes of Oreo cookies: mini, regular and Double Stuffed

The most popular cookie in the world, based on sales, is the Oreo. The Oreo is made by Nabisco or Cadbury depending on the region. Both are a subsidiary of Mondelez International.

In addition to their traditional design of two chocolate wafers separated by a vanilla creme filling, Oreo cookies have been produced in many different varieties since they were first introduced.

== Varieties ==
- Double Stuf Oreo (introduced in 1974) have about twice the normal amount of white creme filling. They are also available in both a golden version as well as a gluten free version. In the UK and other parts of the world they are called Double Creme Oreo and formerly Double Stuff Oreo (spelt with 2 f's instead of 1) and are currently only available in original.
- Football Oreo, football-shaped Oreo cookies, introduced in 1976. They have since been offered multiple times as a limited time offer.
- Big Stuf Oreo (introduced in 1987), were several times the size of a normal Oreo. Sold individually, each Big Stuf contained 250 calories (1,000 kJ) and 13 grams of fat. They were discontinued in 1991.
- Oreo Mini, initially Mini Oreo, originally released in 1991, are bite-sized versions of ordinary Oreo cookies. After being discontinued in the late 1990s they were re-released in 2000 along with the redesigned 2001 Dodge Caravan as part of a promotional tie-in with DaimlerChrysler (now Mercedes-Benz Group and Stellantis). Their 1990s packaging consisted of a "miniaturized" version of the full-size cardboard tray and box used in packaging at the time. Their current packaging consists of a plastic, foil-lined bag. Mini Oreos are available in original, golden, and peanut butter varieties, as well as in Nabisco To-Go Cups, lidded plastic cups which are designed to fit into car cupholders.

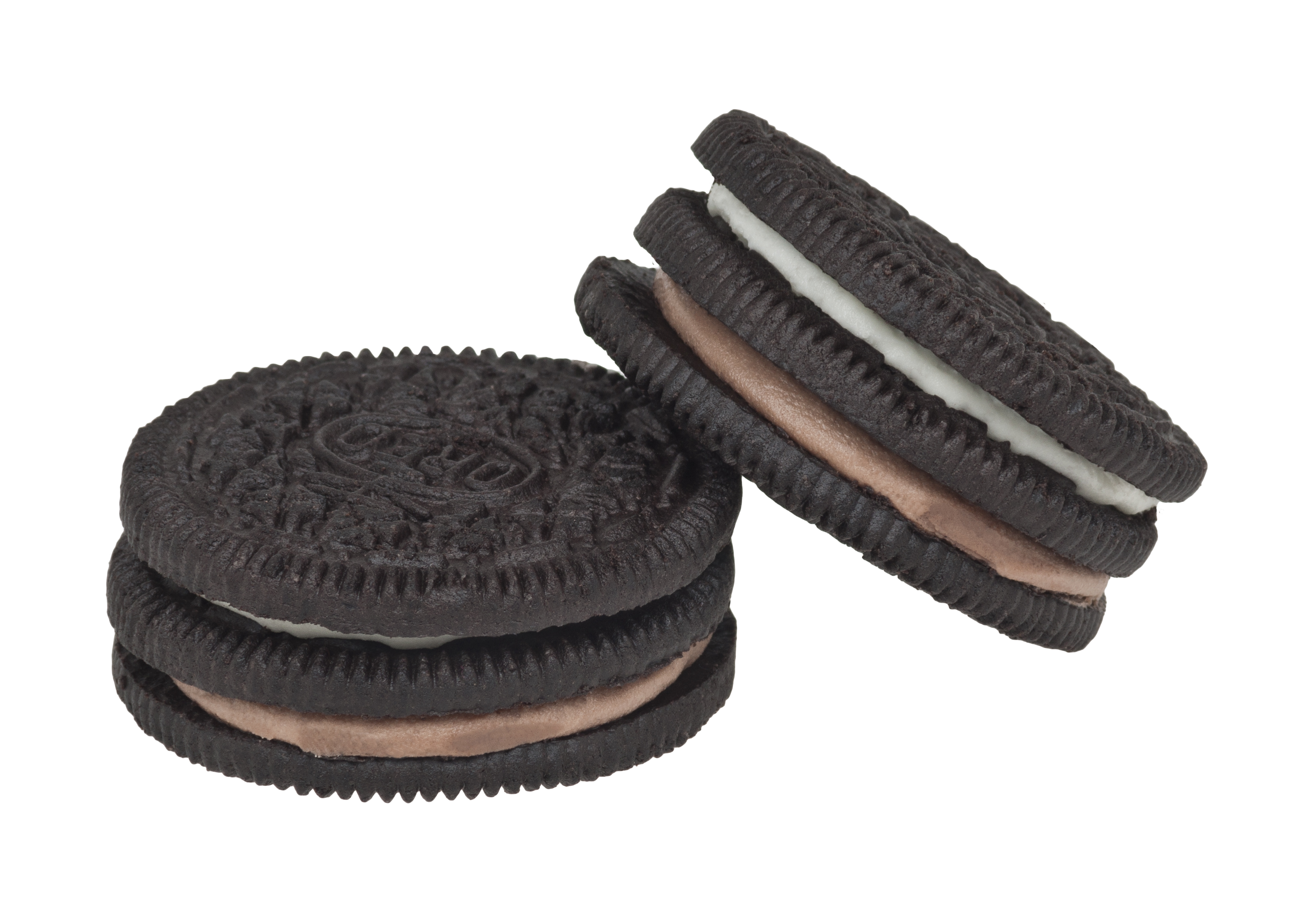
Triple Double Oreos

- NBA Dynasty Oreo, which were released in March 2021 for a limited time, were regular Oreo cookies that featured NBA team logos (such as the Golden State Warriors, Boston Celtics and Miami Heat) on them.
- Triple Double Oreo, which were first released in 2011, combined three chocolate wafers with two layers of creme, one vanilla, and one chocolate. They have since been discontinued.
- Triple Double Neapolitan Oreo, they were similar to the original triple double Oreo cookies, but were three vanilla Oreo cookies, with chocolate filling between the first and second cookies, and strawberry filling between the second and third. They have since been discontinued.
- Triple Double Chocolate Mint Oreo were limited edition cookies with chocolate and mint creme.
- Mega Stuf Oreo, introduced in February 2013, are similar to Double Stuf Oreo cookies, but with even more cream filling. They formerly came in a golden variety as well, however, those have since been discontinued.
- Oreo Thins, released in 2015, are thin versions of these cookies. They are currently produced in the following flavor varieties: original, golden, mint, lemon, tiramisu, and Irish cream.
- Oreo Thins Extra Stuf, released in January 2022, combines the cookie structure of an Oreo thin (for a lighter, crispier crunch) and comparably more creme filling than the original Oreo (but less than that of the Double Stuf).
- The Most Stuf, initially a limited edition release in 2019 and early 2020 before quietly being made permanent in late 2020, are regular Oreos that have even more creme filling than the Mega Stuf variety. They are approximately four times the size of regular Oreos. During its original limited time release, they were widely offered in a regular package size, but the permanent version is currently only offered in four packs at convenience stores and gas stations.
- Gluten Free Oreo, first introduced in January 2021, is currently produced in original, Double Stuf, golden, lemon, and mint varieties.
- Oreo x The Batman, released in early 2022 to coincide with the film, are limited edition cookies with Batman's head stamped on them.
- The Most Oreo Oreo, introduced in January 2023, is a limited edition Oreo variety that consisted of chocolate cookies with Most Stuf sized levels of cream filling. They are similar to the original sized cookies and cream Oreos that were produced as a limited time offering in 2015.
- Oreo Loaded, which were introduced in 2025, are similar to the limited time Most Oreo Oreos in that they are cookies with a greater amount of cream filling. They also contain Oreo cookie pieces inside of the cream filling.

== Flavors ==
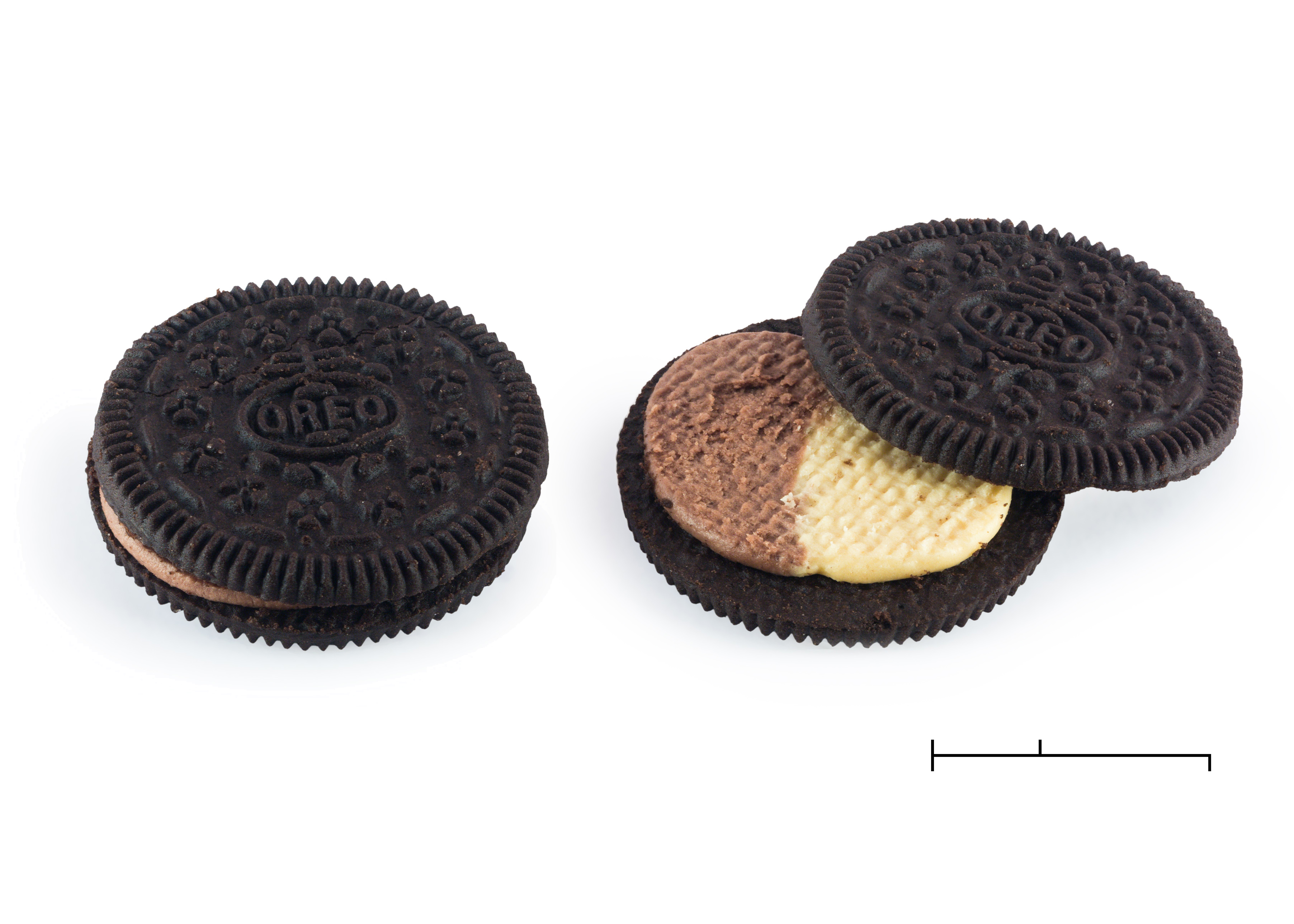
Peanut butter and chocolate Oreos

- Android Oreo, a special cross promotional Oreo cookie with the Google Android logo on one side and "green" flavoring. They were offered for a limited time.
- Chocolate Creme Oreo cookies were introduced in 2001.
- Coconut Delight Oreo cookies, introduced in Indonesia. As its name implies, they are an Oreo cookie with coconut crème filling. These have since been discontinued.
- Strawberry Milkshake Oreo cookies, introduced in Canada, and sold for a limited time in the United States, was an Oreo cookie with strawberry flavoring.
  - Strawberry Creme Oreo cookies, introduced in Indonesia, Malaysia, Philippines, South Korea, Singapore and Chile, were released in 2001.
  - Strawberry Cheesecake Oreo
- Green Tea Oreo cookies, released in China and Japan.
- Lemon Ice Oreo cookies, introduced in Japan.
- Organic Oreo cookies, introduced in 2006, were plain Oreo cookies made with organic flour and organic sugar. They have since been discontinued.
- Blueberry Ice Cream Oreo cookies, introduced in Singapore, Indonesia, and Malaysia in 2010. Also sold in Thailand, Vietnam and China.
- Orange Ice Cream Oreo cookies, introduced in Indonesia, Malaysia, Singapore and Thailand in 2011.

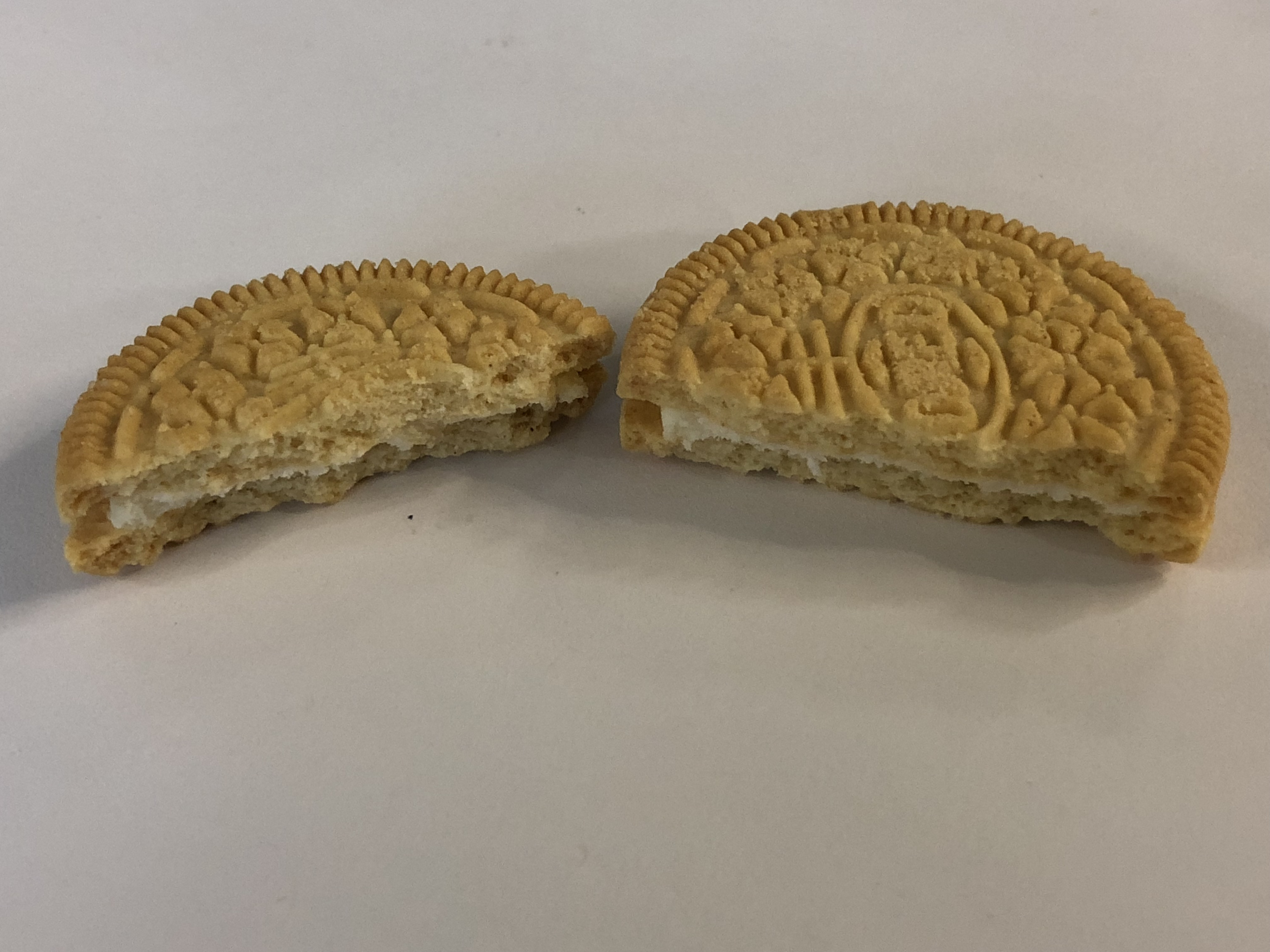
Golden Oreo

- Golden Oreo cookies were introduced in 2004. They feature vanilla flavored cookies instead of chocolate ones.
  - Double Stuf Golden Oreo cookies, which were introduced in late August 2009, are Double Stuf Oreo cookies with Golden Oreo cookies instead of the regular chocolate Oreo cookies.
  - Mega Stuf Golden Oreo cookies were a version of the Golden Oreo with three times the filling. They have since been discontinued.
  - Golden Oreo cookies have vanilla biscuits with other fillings such as vanilla and chocolate, known as Uh-Oh Oreo until its re-branding in 2007. Introduced in Indonesia in 2011 with cookies and creme.
  - Chocolate Creme Golden Oreo cookies, introduced in 2012, were original golden Oreos with the addition of chocolate creme, becoming an inverted color scheme of the original Oreos. They have since been discontinued.
  - Oreo Heads or Tails cookies featured vanilla creme filling with a chocolate Oreo wafer on one side and a Golden Oreo wafer on the other. They have since been discontinued.
  - Creamsicle Oreo cookies, offered for a limited time, featured vanilla and orange creme filling with vanilla Oreo wafers.
- Oreo DQ Blizzard Creme cookies were a limited edition Oreo released in April 2010. They celebrated the 25th anniversary of the Dairy Queen Blizzard.
- Double Delight Oreo cookies, introduced in 1987, have chocolate cookies with two fillings, notably peanut butter and chocolate, mint and creme, and coffee and creme flavors. They have since been discontinued.
  - There are also ongoing fruit series: orange and mango, raspberry and blueberry, grape and peach in China.
- Cool Mint Creme Oreo cookies were a Double Stuf Oreo with a mildly minty creme filling. They have since been discontinued.
- Peanut Butter Oreo cookies are a Double Stuf Oreo with a peanut butter creme filling.
- Milk Chocolate Covered Mint Oreo cookies were similar to Milk Chocolate Oreo but have a mint-flavored filling. They have since been discontinued.
- Banana Split Creme Oreo cookies, which featured a light yellow banana-flavor filling, were available for a limited time in 2008.
- Brownie Batter Oreo cookies which were introduced in August 2015 for a limited time, were chocolate cookies with brownie batter flavored creme filling.
- Sugar Free Oreo cookies, introduced in 2006, cost over twice as much as regular Oreo cookies, and contained only trace amounts of sugar, ten fewer calories per serving, 0.5 grams more fat and 450% more fiber. They have since been discontinued.
- Reduced Fat Oreo cookies, introduced in 2006, cost the same as regular Oreo cookies, had as much sugar, 10 fewer calories per serving, about 35% less fat and the same amount of fiber. They have since been discontinued.
- During springtime, around Halloween and Christmastime, special edition "Double Stuf Oreo" cookies are produced with colored frosting reflecting the current season (blue or yellow, orange, and red or green respectively). One side of each seasonal cookie is also stamped with an appropriate design: spring cookies feature flowers, butterflies, etc., and the Halloween Oreos bear a jack o'lantern, ghost, cat, flock of bats, and/or a broom riding witch, among other designs. The 2023 version had five designs: spiderweb, jack o'lantern, broom riding witch, ghost face with the word "boo", and the words "dare to dunk".
- Dulce de leche Oreos, which were sold in Argentina, had Dulce de Leche flavored filling instead of the usual creme filling.
- Oreo cookies with red-colored creme, were introduced in 2010 for a limited time as a promotion for the release of the movie How To Train Your Dragon.
- Berry Burst Ice Cream Oreo cookies were a limited time offer in 2011. They were described as tasting very similar to the Strawberry Milkshake Oreos which were released in 2008.
- Birthday Cake Oreo cookies were a limited-edition flavor which was released in February–July 2012 to celebrate Oreo's 100th birthday. They were made of two chocolate Oreo cookies with a birthday-cake flavored filling with sprinkles. This edition replaced the traditional Oreo logo on one side with a birthday candle and the words "OREO 100". The flavor has since been reintroduced, with "double stuf" creme filling in both chocolate and golden Oreo varieties, but the cookies no longer display the "OREO 100" print. The golden variety has since been discontinued, however, it was released for a limited time in 2025.
- Birthday Cake Oreo - Fudge Dipped Vanilla were a limited-edition release in February–July 2012 to celebrate Oreo's 100th birthday. They were made of one vanilla Oreo cookie coated in fudge with a birthday cake flavored filling and sprinkles inside.
- Candy Cane Oreo cookies were first released for the holidays in 2012, later returning as Peppermint Oreo in the years following.

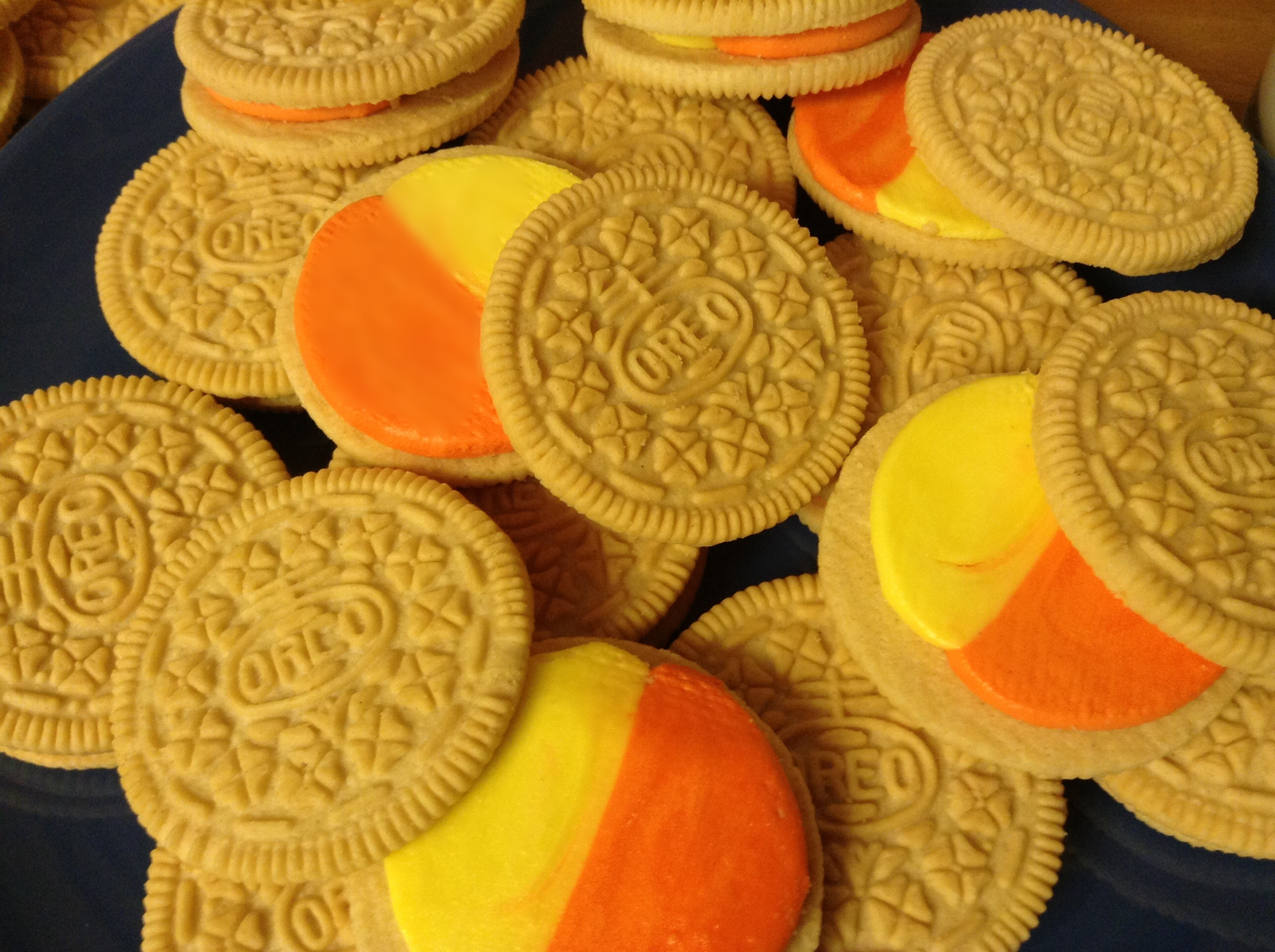
Candy Corn Oreos

- Candy Corn Oreo cookies were a limited edition Halloween-related flavor released in 2012 and 2013. They made another return in 2016 at Target stores only. They were made of two golden Oreo cookies with half yellow and half orange creme filling.
- Gingerbread Oreo cookies were a limited edition release made of two golden Oreo cookies with a mild gingerbread-flavored filling.
- The American Creme were a limited edition release in 2012 made of two golden Oreo cookies with red-and-blue colored creme. Another version, called “Team USA”, were released in summer 2020 for the Olympics, despite the event being postponed until 2021 due to the COVID-19 pandemic. These consisted of red, white, and blue colored creme layered one on top of the other, and contained about as much creme as Double Stuf Oreos.
- Berry Oreo cookies were made of chocolate Oreo cookies with berry-flavored filling.
- Lemon Twist Oreo cookies were a limited edition release in 2012 that returned in 2013, made of two golden Oreo cookies with a lemon flavored filling.
- Triple Double Neapolitan Oreo cookies were a limited edition release in 2012 made of three golden Oreo cookies formed as a double sandwich of chocolate-and-strawberry creme fillings. They made a return in June 2022, but instead of the triple double version, it consists of two waffle cone-flavored cookies with three creme fillings in the middle: vanilla, chocolate and strawberry.
- Prime Berry Creme Oreo cookies were released on June 27, 2013, in Manila, Philippines. They were made of two Oreo cookies with blueberry Ice-Cream-flavored filling. They were inspired by the movie Transformers: Age of Extinction
- Ice Cream Rainbow Shure, Bert! Oreo cookies were a limited edition release in 2013, made of two golden Oreo cookies with a layer of tricolor raspberry and lime sherbet flavored cream filling.
- Watermelon Oreo cookies were a limited edition release for the summer of 2013, made of two golden Oreo cookies with a watermelon flavoured cream filling.
- Strawberries n' Creme cookies were a limited edition release in 2013, made of two golden Oreo cookies with a cream of one half strawberry flavored and one half similar to the traditional Oreo cream flavor.
- Banana Split Oreo cookies were a limited edition release in the fall of 2013. They featured a Double Stuf cookie of one golden and one chocolate Oreo and strawberry and banana flavored cream filling.
- Limeade Oreo cookies, which were released in 2014 for a limited time, were two golden Oreo cookies with a lime flavored cream filling.
- SpongeBob Oreo cookies were a limited edition release in 2014 featuring chocolate cookies with yellow creme with a SpongeBob SquarePants character stamped on the cookie.
- Fruit Punch Oreo cookies were a limited edition release in 2014, made of vanilla cookies with a fruit punch flavored cream filling.
- Cookie Dough Oreo cookies were a limited edition release in March 2014, made of chocolate cookies with a cookie dough flavored cream filling.
- Caramel Apple Oreo cookies were a limited edition release in August 2014 exclusively at Target stores, made of vanilla cookies with a caramel apple flavored cream filling .
- Pumpkin Spice Oreo cookies, a limited edition release in September 2014 that returned in 2017 and again in 2022, are made of Golden Oreo cookies with pumpkin spice flavored filling.
- Red Velvet Oreo cookies were a limited edition release in February 2015, made of red Oreo cookies with a cream cheese flavored filling. They eventually became a permanent addition to the lineup, however, they were eventually discontinued. They reappeared as a limited edition release several years later.
- Reese's Peanut Butter Cup Oreo cookies were introduced in May 2014 for a limited time. They were similar to Peanut Butter Oreos, but with half peanut butter and half chocolate filling.
- Cotton Candy Oreo cookies were a limited edition release in April 2015 exclusively at Target stores, made of two golden Oreo cookies with cotton candy flavored cream filling. They were re-released in June 2023.
- S'mores Oreo cookies were a limited edition release in May 2015, made of two graham flavored Oreo cookies filled with both chocolate and marshmallow flavored creme. They were re-released in May 2021 and May 2023. In May 2023, they were renamed as "S'mOREO", putting "S'm" in front of the standard "OREO" label.
- Root Beer Float Oreo cookies were a limited edition release in July 2014, made of two golden Oreo Cookies filled with root beer flavored cream filling.
- Key Lime Pie Oreo were a limited edition release in July 2015, made of two graham flavored Oreo cookies filled with key lime flavored cream filling.
- Marshmallow Crispy Oreos were a limited edition release in March 2014, made of two golden Oreo cookies with a marshmallow flavored creme filling and Rice Krispies.
- Cookies & Creme Oreo cookies were a limited edition release in July 2015, made of chocolate Oreo cookies with cookies and cream flavored filling.
- Toasted Coconut Oreo were a limited edition release in September 2015, made of vanilla cookies with toasted coconut flavored cream filling that featured flakes of toasted coconut.
- Oreo Soft Cookies, introduced in Japan, are soft cookies with various flavors like strawberry, macadamia nut, chestnut, Matcha green tea, lemon cheesecake, Blueberry cheesecake, and vanilla.
- Cinnamon Bun Oreos cookies which were released in January 2016, were made of cinnamon cookies with cream cheese frosting flavored creme. They were offered for a limited time.
- Filled Cupcake Oreos cookies were a limited edition release on February 8, 2016, made of chocolate cookies with a ring of chocolate creme and a dollop of vanilla creme in the center, similar to the Hostess CupCake.
- Fruity Crisps Oreo cookies were a limited edition release in June 2016. They were made of golden Oreo cookies with a creme with fruit flavored colorful rice crisps similar to Fruity Pebbles but without the Post brand name.
- Blueberry Pie Oreo cookies were a limited edition release in June 2016, consisting of vanilla cookies with blueberry pie flavored cream. They were released exclusively at Target stores. They were later re-released in 2025.
- Chocolate Strawberry Oreo cookies were released in December 2016 for a limited time. They featured a chocolate cream that surrounded a strawberry flavored cream center."
- Swedish Fish Oreo cookies were released in August 2016 for a limited time. They combined regular Oreo cookies with creme flavored to resemble the Swedish Fish candy. They were released exclusively through Kroger stores.

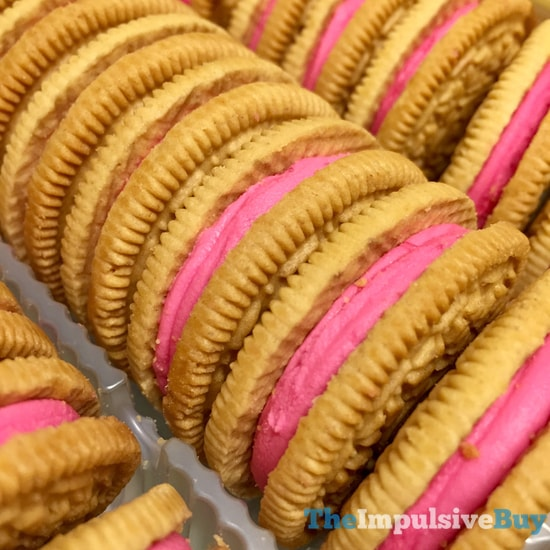
Peeps Oreos

- Peeps Oreo cookies were a limited edition release in February 2017, made of two vanilla cookies filled with Marshmallow Peeps flavored creme".
- Firework Oreo cookies were a limited edition release in May 2017. They were like the original Oreos, but they featured bits of red and blue popping candy in the filling.
- Mississippi mud pie Oreo cookies were a limited edition release in May 2017, made of a mix of a chocolate cream filling and a lighter whipped cream filling. They were exclusively sold at Dollar General stores.
- Jelly Donut Oreo cookies were a limited edition release in May 2017, made of golden Oreo cookies with a ring of vanilla creme and a dollop of jelly-flavored creme in the center.
- Waffles & Syrup Oreo cookies were a limited edition release in May 2017, made of golden Oreo cookies with a ring of vanilla cream and a dollop of maple-flavored cream filling in the center.
- Dunkin' Donuts Mocha Oreo cookies were a limited edition release in July 2017, made of chocolate Oreo cookies and mocha flavored cream filling.
- PB&J Oreo cookies were a limited edition release in August 2017, made of golden Oreo cookies with a peanut butter and jelly flavored creme.
- Cookie Butter Oreo cookies were released in September 2017 for a limited time. They were made of graham-flavored Oreo cookies and cookie butter-flavored creme.
- Apple Pie Oreo cookies were released in September 2017 for a limited time. They were made of graham-flavored Oreo cookies and apple pie flavored creme.
- Mystery Oreos, which were a limited edition release in October 2017, contained a regular Oreo cookie with a mystery flavor filling. Oreo hosted a contest to guess the flavor until December 2017. Fruity Pebbles was confirmed as the mystery flavor.
- Dark and White Chocolate Oreo, which were released in October 2017 for a limited time, were made of chocolate cookies and dark and white chocolate flavored fillings.
- Chocolate Hazelnut Oreo, Spicy Hot Cinnamon Oreo and Hot Cocoa Oreo are three different cookie flavors that were all released in January 2018 for a limited time.
- Cherry Cola Oreo, Kettle Corn Oreo, and Pina Colada Oreo thins were released in April 2018 for a limited time as part of the "My Oreo Creation" campaign.
- Good Humor Strawberry Shortcake Oreo cookies were a limited edition release in July 2018, made of golden cookies with strawberry shortcake flavored Oreo filling.
- Chocolate Peanut Butter Pie Oreo were a limited edition release in June 2018, made of graham flavored cookies that featured a chocolate and peanut butter flavored cream filling. They eventually became a permanent offering, however, as of 2025, they have been discontinued.
- Rocky Road Trip Oreo cookies were a limited edition release in July 2018, made of chocolate Oreos with rocky road-flavored creme filling and marshmallow bits.
- Peppermint Bark Oreo cookies were a limited edition release in October 2018, made of peppermint-flavored creme filling and "crunchy sugar crystals."
- Mickey Mouse Oreo cookies were a limited edition release in September 2018, celebrating Mickey Mouse's 90 Year Anniversary with a birthday cake flavored Oreo creme filling.
- Hot Chicken Wing Oreo & Wasabi Oreo cookies were released in August 2018 in China made of hot wing and Wasabi flavored creme filling, respectively.
- Choc'o Brownie Oreo cookies were released in September 2018 for a limited time. They contained a chocolate brownie creme filling.
- Crispy Tiramisu Oreo cookies were introduced in Japan in December 2017.
- Dark Chocolate Oreo cookies were released in January 2019, made of Oreo cookies with dark chocolate with cocoa creme filling. They have since become a permanent part of the Oreo lineup.
- Love Oreo cookies were a limited edition release in January 2019, celebrating Valentine's Day. They featured a "sweet and tangy" pink flavored creme filling.
- Carrot Cake Oreo cookies were released in January 2019 for a limited time.
- Game of Thrones Oreo were a limited edition release in April 2019, to commemorate the 8th season of Game of Thrones. They featured the same filling as regular Oreos with Game of Thrones character designs stamped onto the cookies.
- Marshmallow Moon Oreo cookies were a limited edition release in June 2019, celebrating the 50th Anniversary of the first man on the moon. They contained a dark grey filling that was intended to replicate the color of the moon and they were stamped with a rocket design on one side of the cookie and an astronaut on the other side.
- Mint Chocolate Chip Oreo cookies were a limited edition release in July 2019. They were later rereleased in 2024 for a limited time without the Baskin Robbins promotion.
- Mystery Oreo, were a limited edition release from September to November 2019, made of a chocolate cookie with a mystery flavor filling. Oreo hosted a contest with a $50,000 grand prize to guess the flavor. Churro was confirmed to be the mystery flavor of Oreos. They were later re-released in 2024 as a limited time offering.
- Supreme Oreos, were a limited time collaboration that consisted of red wafers and original creme filling with the Supreme logo stamped on it. They were released online in March 2020.
- Caramel Coconut Oreo and Chocolate Marshmallow Oreo, which contains caramel creme mixed with toasted coconut pieces, and marshmallow creme, respectively. Both were released in January 2020 for a limited time.
- Double Oreo Chiara Ferragni, a special edition launched in Italy in March 2020 with a themed packaging.
- Lady Gaga Oreos (also referred to as Chromatica Oreos), were released in the US for a limited time in 2020 as part of a promotion with the pop singer. The cookie consisted of a pink cookie with a green creme and follows the same flavor palate as the standard ‘Golden’ Oreo. Other markets, such as the UK, Spain and Italy received regular vanilla Oreos in Chromatica themed packaging.
- Brookie-O Brownie Oreo, released in January 2021 for a limited time, consisted of chocolate Oreo cookies with three levels of creme filling: brownie, vanilla and cookie dough. They were re-released in September 2022.
- Java Chip Oreo, also released in January 2021, consists of chocolate cookies with coffee flavored creme mixed with chocolate chip pieces. It became a permanent flavor offering.
- Rainbow Oreo, announced in 2020, was part of a promotion with PFLAG National.
- Salted Caramel Brownie Oreo, released in July 2021 for a limited time, consisted of chocolate Oreo cookies (topped with salt) with two layers of salted caramel brownie-flavored creme filling.
- Apple Cider Donut Oreo, which were released in August 2021 for a limited time, consisted of golden cookies with an apple cider donut-flavored creme filling.
- Pokémon Oreos, a limited time collaboration with Pokémon, featured sixteen different character designs stamped on the cookies. They were released in September 2021.
- Ultimate Chocolate Oreo and Toffee Crunch Oreo, both released in January 2022, consisted of dark chocolate- and toffee flavored-cream filling respectively. The toffee crunch flavor became a permanent offering.
- Easter Egg Oreo, introduced in 2019 for a limited time, features two regular Oreo cookies in an oval shape that resembled Easter eggs.
- Mocha Caramel Latte Oreo, which consisted of mocha latte and caramel creme, were released in April 2022 for a limited time after being announced the previous month.
- Oreo Twists Vanilla & Raspberry and Oreo Twists Vanilla & Caramel, released in the UK in May 2022, are regular chocolate Oreos that consist of vanilla and raspberry creme and vanilla and caramel creme, respectively. They are only available in Asda stores in the UK.
- Snickerdoodle Oreo, a limited edition flavor released in October 2022, consisted of snickerdoodle flavored wafers with cinnamon flavored cream filling and red and green sugar crystals.
- Blackout Cake Oreo, a limited edition flavor released in April 2023, consisted of chocolate Oreo cookies combining two layers of milk chocolate and dark chocolate cake flavored cream filling.
- Super Mario Oreos, a limited time collaboration with Super Mario, consisted of regular chocolate Oreo cookies with sixteen different character designs stamped onto the cookies. They were first released in July 2023.
- Black & White Oreo, a limited edition flavor released in January 2024, consisted of golden Oreo cookies with two halves of creme filling, one black and one white.
- Space Dunk Oreos, a limited edition flavor released in January 2024, contained chocolate cookies with two layers of blue and pink cream filling with popping candy as well as space-inspired designs (such as a rocket ship) stamped onto the cookies.
- Oreo Dirt Cake, a limited edition flavor released in February 2024, consisted of chocolate cookies (sprinkled with gummy worms) with two layers of brownie- and chocolate-flavored creme filling mixed with Oreo bits.
- Star Wars Oreo, a collaboration with Star Wars released in June 2024, consists of regular Oreo cookies with red and blue cream filling.
- Oreo Dream Blue, an exclusive flavor in India with Blue colored creme
- Oreo Coca-Cola, a limited time flavor, featured one classic chocolate cookie and one red colored golden cookie embossed with Coca-Cola inspired designs, stuffed with a Coca Cola inspired cream filling. The cookies also featured popping candies inside of the cream filling.

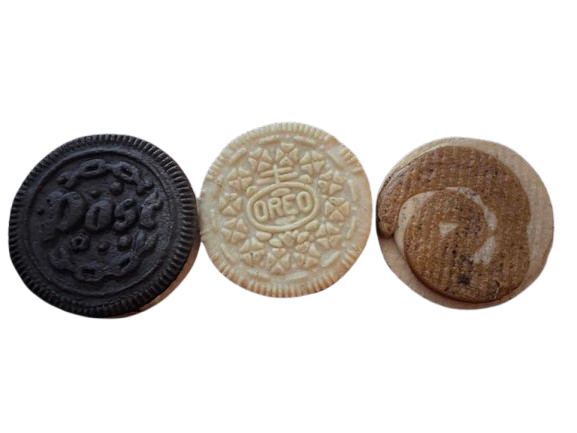
Post Malone Oreos

- Post Malone Oreos, a collaboration with musician Post Malone, were released for a limited time in February 2025. They consisted of a chocolate cookie on top and a golden cookie on the bottom with swirled salted caramel and shortbread-flavored creme. The cookies featured nine different designs that were inspired by Post Malone's artistic journey.
- Chocolate Covered Pretzel Oreos, which were released in 2025 for a limited time, featured a pretzel flavored cookie with a chocolate flavored cream filling.
- Selena Gomez Oreos, a collaboration with the musician Selena Gomez, were released for a limited time in 2025. They featured a chocolate and cinnamon flavored cream filling as well as a condensed milk flavored cream filling, in order to emulate a horchata. They were also stamped with six unique designs that represented Selena Gomez's artistic journey.
- Reese's Oreos, which were released in 2025, featured a layer of Reese's Peanut Butter cream filling sandwiched between two normal chocolate Oreo cookies.
- Delicias de Guayaba Oreo, were a limited edition release exclusive to Venezuela, released on August 11, 2025.
- Apple Pie A La Mode Oreos, which were released in 2025 for a limited time, featured an apple pie and vanilla flavored cream filling sandwiched between two golden Oreo cookies.
- Oreo BTS Brown Sugar Pancake, a collaboration with South Korean band BTS, were released for a limited time in June 2026, featuring 12 exclusive designs for the engravings on the purple cookies, signifying the link between the group and their fandom A.R.M.Y. They also featured a Hotteok cream filling, using a brown sugar layered cream. Additionally, fans can send their own love letters for a chance to win the product on the website.

== Other products ==
- Norwegian Freia milk chocolate with Oreo bites
- Oreo Brownie, a chocolate brownie that contains Oreo cookie pieces and is sometimes topped with extra Oreos and/or frosting.
- Fudge Covered Oreo, White Fudge Oreo, Mint Fudge Oreo, and Milk Chocolate Oreo are covered in either a layer of fudge, white fudge, mint fudge, or milk chocolate respectively. The Mint Fudge variety is nearly identical to Mystic Mints, produced by Nabisco from the 1970s through the 1990s. In the US, the white fudge variety is marketed as seasonal and is only broadly available the Thanksgiving-Christmas holiday period.
- Oreo Fudge Cremes are a single cookie (not a sandwich), with creme, covered in fudge, in various flavors.
- Oreo Fudgees are rectangular "dipping" shaped Oreo cookies with a chocolate fudge filling (different from the Chocolate Creme Oreo).
- Oreo Fudge Sundae Creme, a limited edition introduced in 2009, are chocolate ring cookies with traditional white creme filling on half a ring cookie, and fudge creme on the other half.
- Oreo Fudge Rings are chocolate ring cookies with the traditional white creme filling drizzled over them.

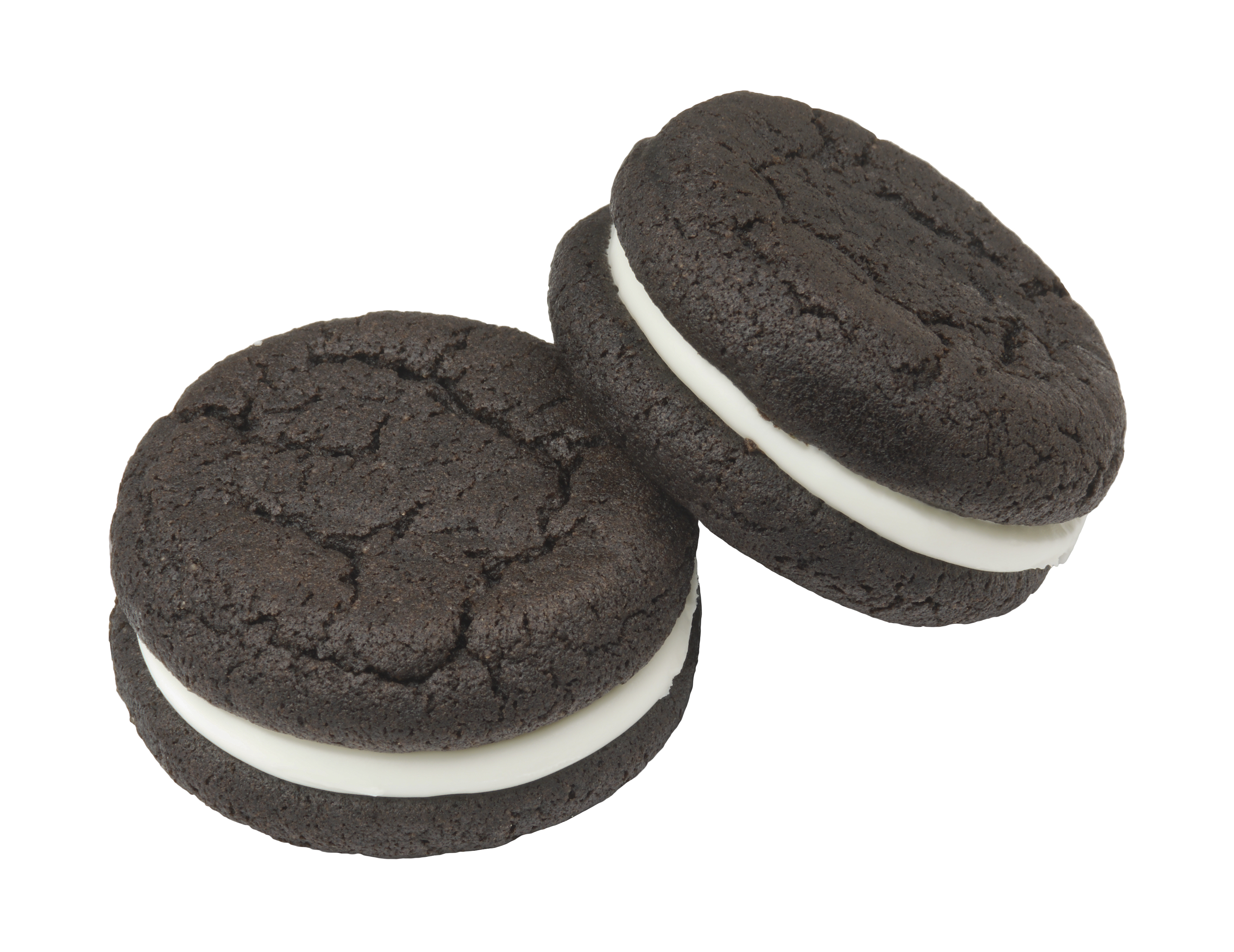
Oreo Cakesters

- Oreo Cakesters: Introduced in 2007, Oreo Cakesters are Oreo's version of a whoopie pie, soft chocolate snack cakes with vanilla, chocolate or peanut butter creme in the middle. They were discontinued in 2012. In 2021, a TikTok creator named Stefan Jonson started a movement to have them brought back. The same year, Nabisco announced that Cakesters would be making a return in 2022, including Oreo and Nutter Butter varieties.
- Oreo Wafers are long wafer sticks layered on top of each other with creme filling in the middle. Sold in Asia.
- Oreo WaferStix are long wafer sticks with a creme filling and covered by chocolate.
- Oreo Handi-Snacks are plastic holders with rectangular Oreo cookies and a little box of icing.
- Oreo Sippers were Oreo flavored sticks that could be eaten or used as a straw; it was discontinued in 2012.
- Oreo Star only sold in Asian countries.
- Oreo Soft Cake are chocolate sponge cake bars with a thin creme filling in the center, replicating an Oreo cookie in cake form. Sold in Indonesia.
- Creme Filled Oreo Brownie, first released in 2013, is a chocolate brownie with Oreo Creme Filling inside.
- Jell-O Oreo Pudding – Jell-O brand chocolate pudding at the bottom and on top, with vanilla in the middle.
- Jell-O Oreo Instant Pudding – also named Cookies n' Creme. The box contains instant vanilla pudding with real cookie pieces.
- In 1997, Post introduced Oreo O's, a cereal consisting of chocolatey O-shaped pieces with a hint of Oreo flavor. It was discontinued in 2007 but reintroduced in 2017.
- Golden Oreo O's were introduced in 2018 and first sold at Walmart. In 2019, Post introduced Mega Stuf Oreo O's, which are similar to the chocolate version, but with marshmallows, similar to the previously discontinued Extreme Creme Taste Oreo O's. This cereal was also sold at Walmart.
- Oreo Puffs, released in December 2024, is a cereal that consists of Oreo-flavored puffs with marshmallows, similar to that of Cocoa Puffs. These are the successor to the previously discontinued Oreo O's, and are sold at Target and Walmart stores nationwide.
- Halloween Oreo Puffs, released for a limited time from August to October 2025, are just original Oreo Puffs that turn the milk "spooky orange", due to a slight recipe change.
- Oreo Ice Cream. Licensed by Breyers, Good Humor, and Klondike in the US, and Nestlé in Canada. Flavors are:
  - Oreo Ice Cream (blended Oreo cookies in vanilla ice cream)
  - Oreo Ice Cream Sandwich (extra large Oreo wafers with vanilla ice cream in the middle)
  - Oreo Ice Cream Bar (vanilla light ice cream mixed with Oreo pieces with a chocolate flavored coating with Oreo bits)
  - Mint Oreo Ice Cream (blended Oreo cookies in mint ice cream)
  - Chocolate Oreo Ice Cream (blended Oreo cookies in chocolate ice cream)
  - 2 in 1 Oreo and Chips Ahoy! Ice Cream (blended Oreo and Chips Ahoy! cookie pieces in vanilla and sweet cream ice cream, respectively)
  - Many notable fast-food restaurants, such as Dairy Queen and Baskin Robbins, serve Oreo-flavored ice cream desserts and milkshakes
  - Oreo Ice Cream is also called Cookies and Creme.
- Easy-Bake Oreo Mix – two easy-bake chocolate cakes with a marshmallow filling topped with an Oreo cookie topping
- Oreo Holiday Treats – Oreo cookies covered in dark chocolate
- Oreo Chocolate Candy Bar - A chocolate candy bar with a rectangular Oreo cookie and Oreo creme filling covered in milk chocolate.
- Oreo Pie Crust, a pie crust made of crushed Oreo cookies, sold around the U.S.
- Banana Split Oreo, introduced in Canada, an Oreo cookie with banana flavoring.
- Oreo Milkshake is a Kraft Foods recipe consisting of Oreo cookies, milk, vanilla ice-cream and chocolate syrup.
- Oreo Cookie Cheesecake, manufactured by The Cheesecake Factory

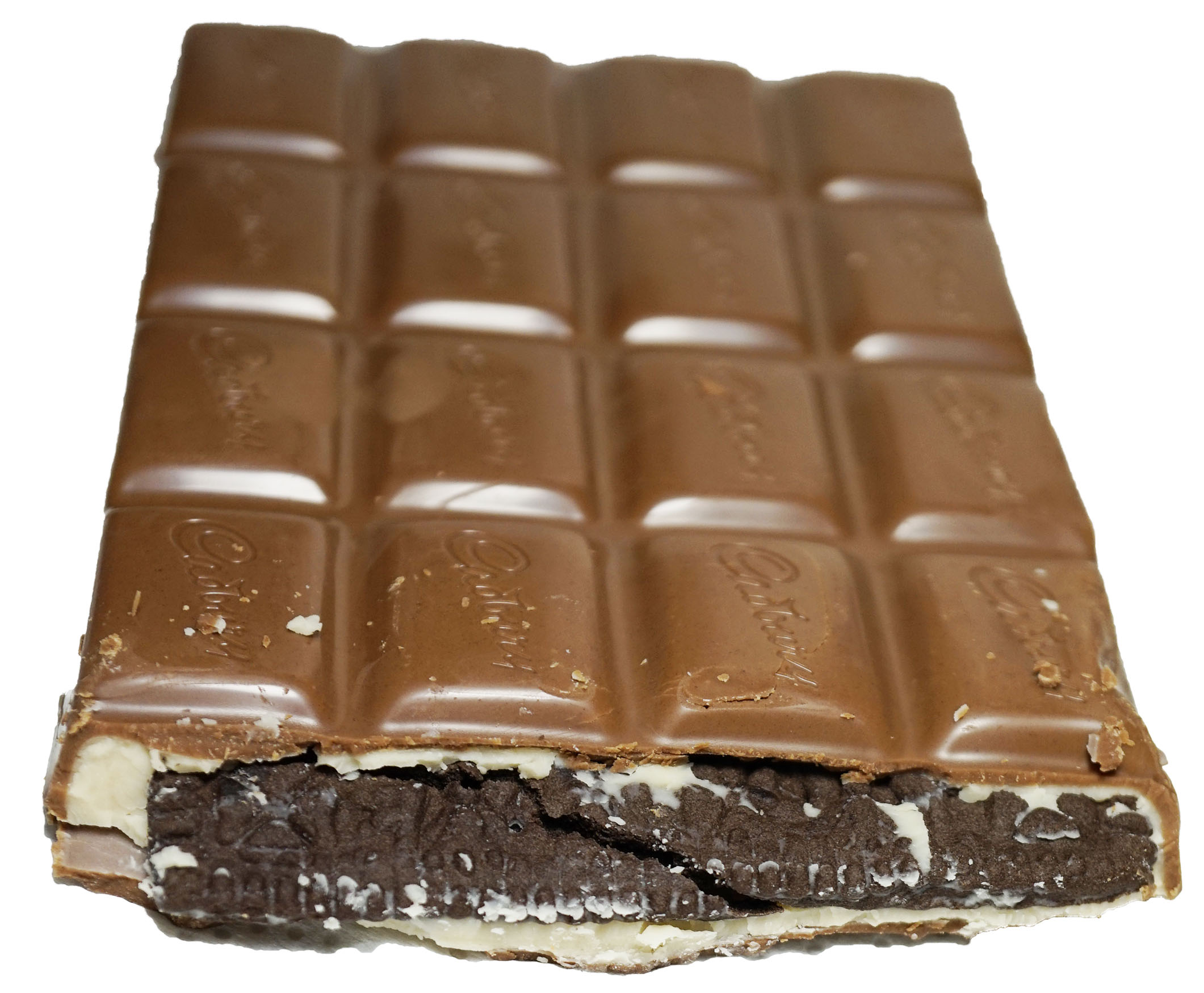
Cadbury Dairy Milk 'with Oreo'

- Cadbury Dairy Milk 'with Oreo' - Cadbury milk chocolate with an Oreo filling. Also comes in Peanut Butter flavor.
- Milka 'Milka & Oreo' - Milka milk chocolate with an Oreo filling. Also comes in Mint flavor.
- Tim Hortons Canadian-based coffee chain released an 'Oreo' donut - chocolate donut with Vanilla Creme Filling, White Fondant frosting and Oreo cookie crumb topping. They also released an IceCapp with Oreo, these are discontinued as of 2025
- Oreo mini bars, Japanese, in various flavors, e.g. orange chocolate, bitter chocolate, green tea chocolate, Amaou strawberry, macadamia nut.
- Oreo Doughnut (UK)
- Oreo 'alfajor' (sold only in Argentina and Uruguay)
- Nestlé Oreo Ice Cream (Chocolate & Vanilla Flavors)
- Joy Fill Oreos were released on August 2, 2018. (Regular, Caramel.)
- State Fair Oreo Cookies were released on August 2–3, 2018. (Vanilla Crunch, Chocolate Crunch.)
- Oreo Music Box, a record player-like toy that upon placing an Oreo cookie, plays music, and depending on how many bites it has taken, the sounds can also change. Released on November 19, 2018, in limited quantities.
- Ritz and Oreo, a combination of the Ritz cracker and the Oreo cookie. A limited edition, only 1,000 packets were made.
- Oreo Coke, a collaboration with coke released alongside an Oreo flavor, sold in Europe, Asia, North America,
- Oreo Ice Cream, produced by Nestle under license, also sold by Bryers,
- Oreo Brownie, sold by Two-Bite or as a mix by Betty Crocker
- Oreo Frosting, sold by Betty Crocker
