= Crema =

Crema or Cremas may refer to:

== Crema ==
- Crema, Lombardy, a comune in the northern Italian province of Cremona
- Crema, a thin layer of foam at the top of a cup of espresso
- Caffè crema, a type of coffee
- Crema (dairy product), the Spanish word for cream
- Cremà, a part of the Fallas festivity
- Katya Crema (born 1988), Australian alpine and ski cross skier
- AC Crema 1908, a northern Italian association football club from Crema, Lombardy

== Cremas ==
- Crémas, a sweet and creamy alcoholic beverage native to Haiti
- Comunicaciones F.C., a Guatemalan football club colloquially known as Cremas
- Los Cremas, a Peruvian football club

== See also ==
- Cream (disambiguation)
