= Plantà =

Finishing touches to the plantá of Cuba-Literato Azorín streets in 2013

The plantá (which comes from the verb to plant; in Valencian, plantà) is the act of erecting a Falla or bonfire monument, in the Fallas or the Bonfires of Saint John, festivals held respectively in March and June in different localities of the community of Valencia (Spain).The plantà is currently considered the exact moment when the falla or bonfire is completely finished and ready to be visited, with all its "ninots" (human figures made of combustible materials, such as cardboard or wood, which has a critical or mocking nature), posters and a variety of features (lights, matted grass, interpretive signs...).

In the Fallas of Valencia, the plantá takes place on March 14–15, when all the Falla monuments must be positioned correctly. The reason is that the jury appointed by the Central Fallera committee has to go to the next day to assess the falla. Formerly, the plantà began and ended the same day but, due to the complexity of the monuments and the fact that the makers of Fallas are responsible for several Fallas monuments at the same time, it usually begins a few days before beginning on March 10, making it a five-day affair. The burning of the Falla or cremá is carried out four days later, on the night of March 19.

In the Bonfires of Saint John which are celebrated in the city of Alicante, the plantá takes place on June 20. As in Valencia, the next day the jury visits each bonfire before later awarding the prizes in each category. The cremá also takes place four days later, on the night of June 24 to 25.
