= Crème de la crème =

Crème de la crème (French, literally 'cream of the cream') is an idiom meaning "the best of the best", "superlative", or "the very best". It may also refer to:

- Creme de la Creme (band), a defunct German band
- La Crème de la crème, a 2014 French film
- Bake Off: Crème de la Crème, BBC television show

== See also ==
- BenDeLaCreme, American drag queen
- Best of the Best (disambiguation)
- Creamy layer
- Crème de la Crime, part of Severn House Publishers
- Elite
- Upper class
- Upper crust (disambiguation)
