= Cream of the crop =

Cream of the crop may refer to:

- Cream of the Crop, an album by Diana Ross & the Supremes (1969)
- Cream of the Crop (Wanda Jackson album), an album by Wanda Jackson (1968)
- Cream of the Crop, a compilation album by The Dead Milkmen (1998)
- Cream of the Crop 2003, an album by the Allman Brothers Band (2018)

== See also ==
- Crème de la crème (disambiguation)
