= Cremà =

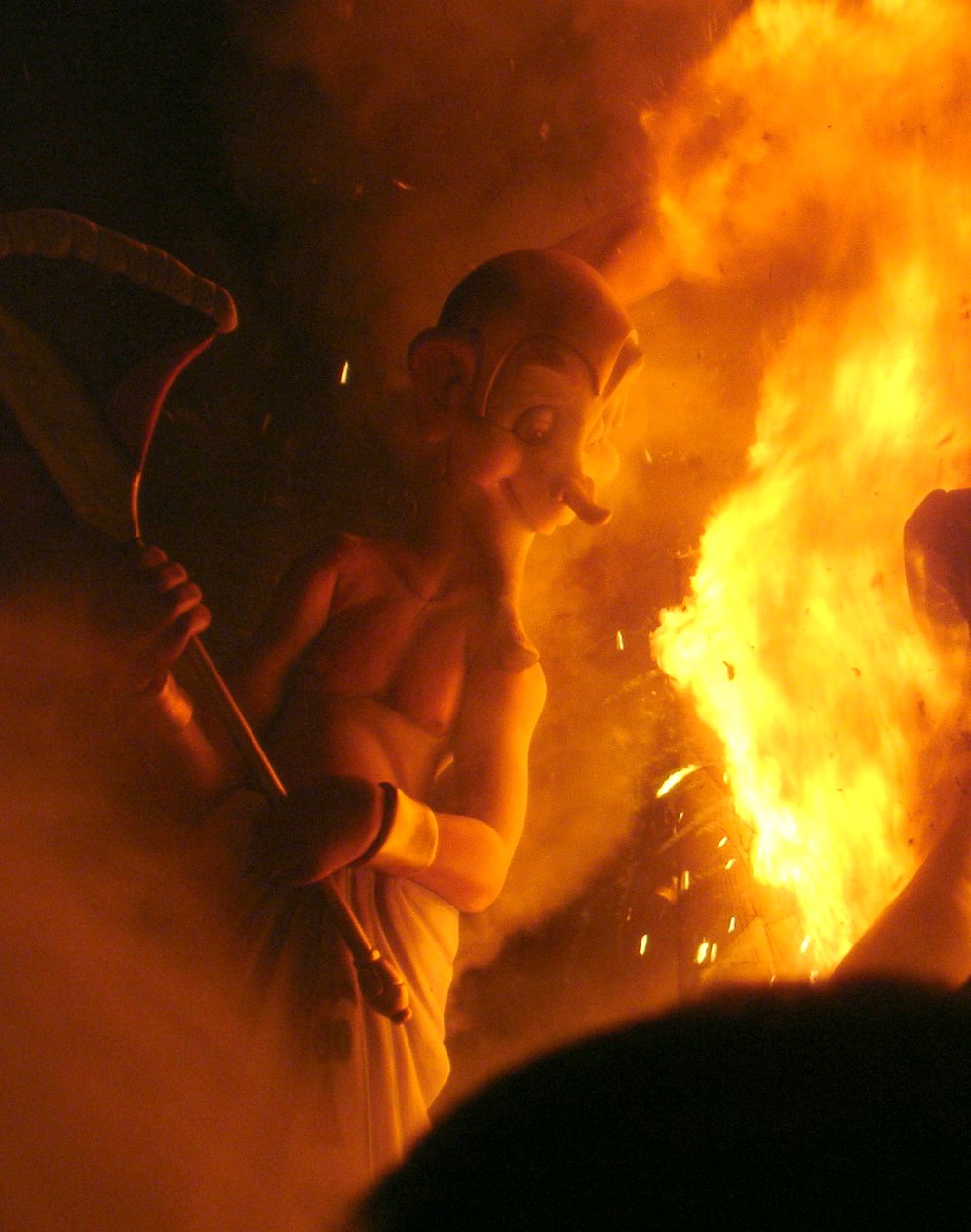
Cremà of a falla in Denia (Alicante).

The cremà (Valencian for "burning") is the act of setting fire to a falla monument, made from materials such as cardboard and wood, during the festivities of several towns in the Valencian community, Spain. A similar celebration is the Bonfires of Saint John from Alicante, also in the Valencian community. In all cases the celebration ends with the burning of the monuments.

In the city of Valencia, where this kind of celebration originated, the cremà of each falla is held on the night of Saint Joseph's Day, 19 March. It consists in burning the monuments erected on the Valencian streets on 15 March. The ceremony is preceded by fireworks which are lit by the commission "fallera mayor". Firstly, around 10 p.m., the child monument is set on fire and at 10:30 p.m. the prize winning falla of the special section is also set on fire. After that, the main falla monuments are burnt at midnight and after half an hour the 1st prize winner of the special section in this category is burnt too. Finally, at 1 a.m. the institutional falla monument, which doesn't take part in the competition, is set on fire in the Town Hall Square.

The cremà also takes place for the Bonfires of Saint John, which are lit in Alicante. It takes place on 24 and 25 June by night, one day after St. John's Eve. The participants usually cry out to the firemen that supervise the fire to be soaked because of the summer heat and the fire; when they start doing it with hoses begins the Banyà. In Alicante the cremà starts at midnight from the castle of Santa Bárbara and it continues until 4a.m.

In all these celebrations it is usual to burn the monument with a traca (a wick lined with firecrackers that explode quickly one after another) and lately with fireworks too. Then the monument is set on fire to the beat of folk songs. In order to prevent all the monuments burning down at the same time, they are usually set on fire at different hours, depending on the prize they have won.

== See also ==
- Fallas
- Bonfire
