= Best of the Best =

Best of the Best may refer to:

- Best of the Best (1989 film), American martial arts film directed by Bob Radler
- Best of the Best (1992 film), Hong Kong action film directed by Herman Yau
- Best of the Best (2026 film), American comedy dance film directed by Lena Khan
- Best of the Best (Milli Vanilli album), 1988
- Best of the Best (Westlife album), a compilation album
- Best of the Best: Championship Karate, a 1992 video game
- Best of the Best: 20 Years of the Year's Best Science Fiction, a 2005 science fiction anthology
- CZW Best of the Best, a professional wrestling tournament
- Best of the Best: Wild and Mild, a 2013 compilation album by Gackt
- Sinatra: Best of the Best, a 2011 compilation album by Frank Sinatra
- The Best of the Best, a 1998 compilation album by Marika Gombitová

== See also ==
- Crème de la crème (disambiguation)
