= Creaming =

Creaming may refer to:

- Creaming (chemistry), separation of an emulsion
- Creaming (food), several different culinary processes
- Milk creaming or cream separation

== See also ==
- Cream (disambiguation)
