= Nutter Butter =

American sandwich cookie brand

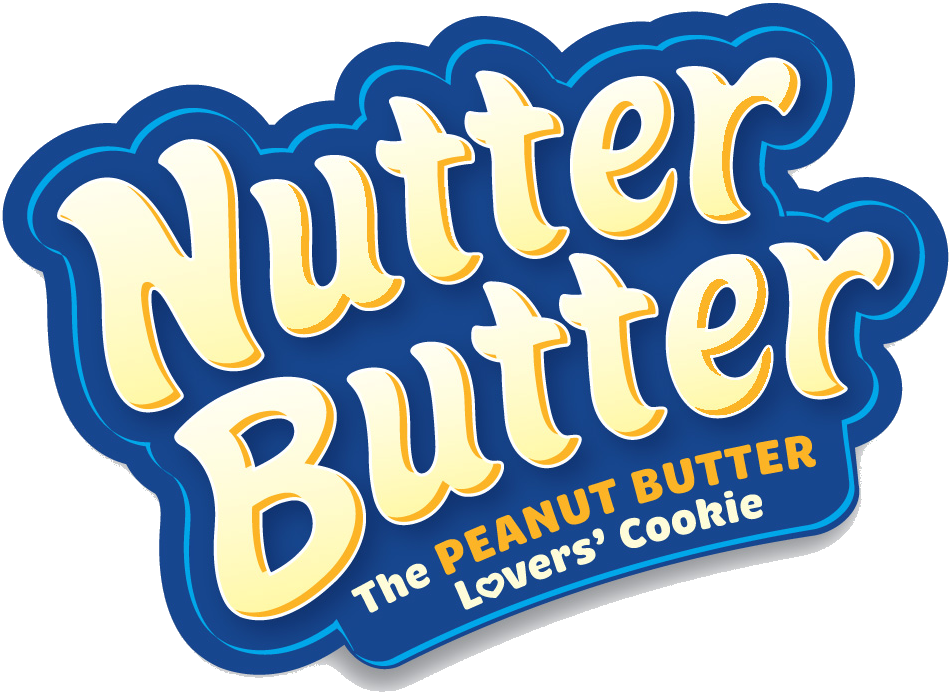

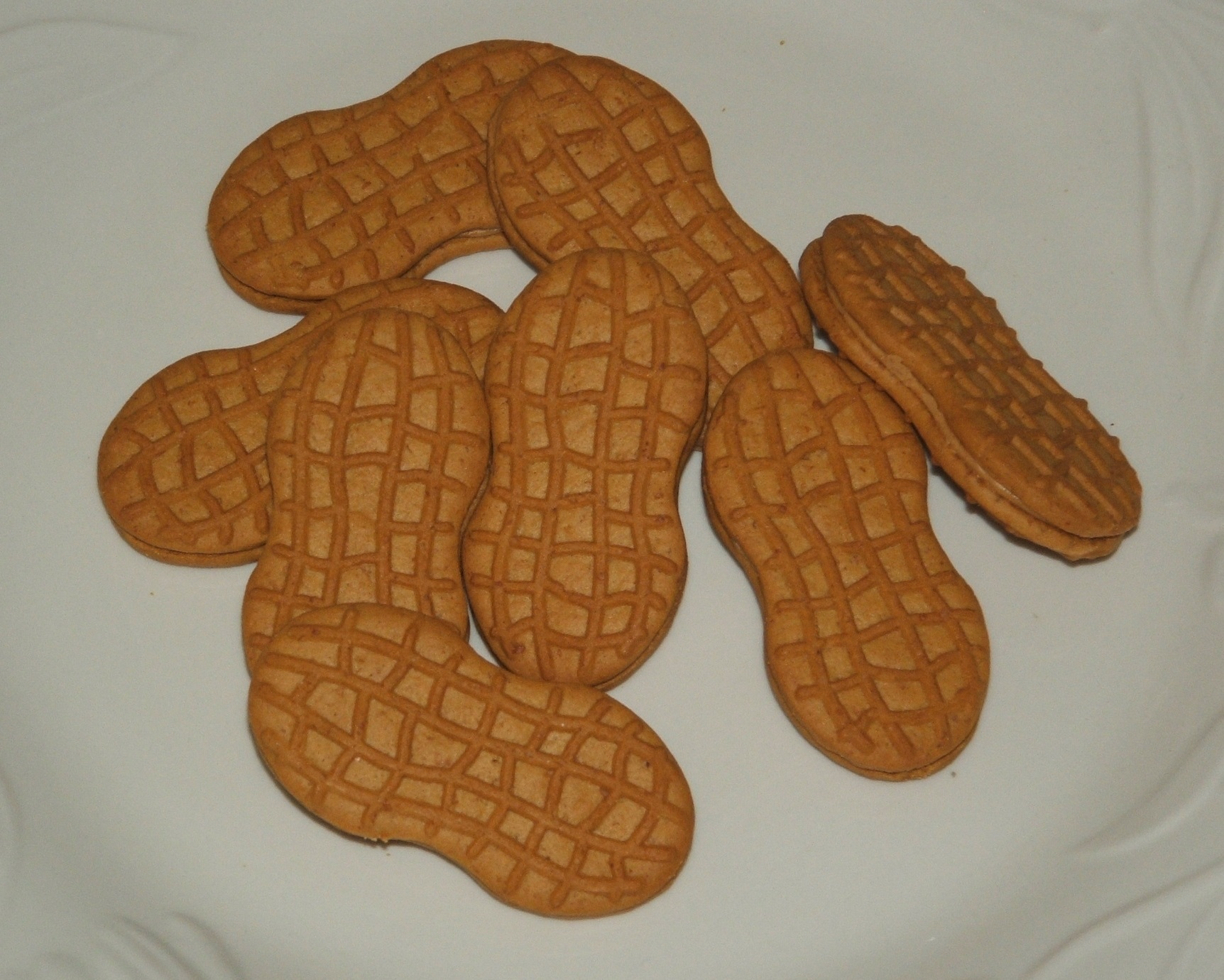
- Nutter Butter biscuits
- Product type: Peanut butter biscuits
- Current owner: Mondelez International
- Country: U.S.
- Introduced: 1969; 57 years ago
- Markets: United States and Canada
- Previous owners: Nabisco
- Website: snackworks.com/nutterbutter

Nutter Butter is an American sandwich cookie brand, first introduced in 1969 and currently owned by Nabisco, which is a subsidiary of Mondelez International. The manufacturer claims it to be the best-selling American peanut butter sandwich cookie, with around a billion estimated to be eaten every year.

== Brand history ==
Nutter Butter by Nabisco was launched in 1969, but the details of its creation remain unknown. The distinctive design was thought to have been created by William A. Turnier, but Nabisco maintains that there is "no way of knowing who came up with the actual visual concept". The company briefly ran an animated ad campaign in 1973 featuring the Nutter Butter Man, a mascot character that resembled Willy Wonka.

Nutter Butter has become synonymous with blood donation. The cookie became so beloved among blood donors that when the American Red Cross stopped offering it around Georgia in 1995, it was reported that donations dropped by 20,000 pints. The controversy ended the following year when Nabisco agreed to donate the Nutter Butters.

In December 2017, a Nutter Butter cereal line was launched by Post Consumer Brands. It debuted at Walmart with a box retailing at around $4.

In October 2018, Krispy Kreme released Nutter Butter and Chips Ahoy! doughnuts which joined the pre-existing Oreo doughnuts. The next year, in January 2019, chocolate fudge-covered Nutter Butters were released alongside similarly covered Oreos.

In May 2019, the CEO of Mondelez International, Dirk Van de Put announced in an interview with CNBC that the company was giving "serious consideration" to adding CBD to certain product lines such as Nutter Butter. He did however say that adding CBD to its family brands "may not be in the company's best interest".

In 2019, 7-Eleven started selling limited edition Nutter Butter lattes and doughnuts and A&W Restaurants launched Nutter Butter and Oreo flavored milkshakes and ice creams. Among other products, Nutter Butter was noted as helping increase Mondelez's sales for the year, despite being one of the company's smaller brands.

In 2021, Nabisco announced it would launch a Nutter Butter version of the Oreo Cakesters in 2022.

From 2023, Nutter Butter implemented a viral marketing strategy on social media, including TikTok, Instagram and X, which gained widespread attention online in September 2024. The strategy utilised nonsensical and absurdist humor and 'trippy' visuals, basing content around a range of mysterious characters. In an interview with The New York Times, one of the brand's content creators suggested that the strategy had been prompted by the idea of a Nutter Butter cookie having a fever dream. It resulted in large numbers of interactions with the company's content; the Nutter Butter account had over a million followers by October 2024 and the ten videos that it posted in September 2024 gained more than 87 million views.
