= Creme (magazine) =

New Zealand magazine for girls

- Cover of April 2013 issue with Lucy Hale
- Categories: Entertainment magazine for girls
- Frequency: Monthly
- First issue: December 1999
- Final issue: 25 August 2014
- Company: Bauer Media
- Country: New Zealand
- Language: English
- Website: Creme

Creme was a monthly New Zealand magazine for girls aged 10 to 18. The last issue was released in August 2014.

== Overview ==
Creme was founded in 1999 by Natalie Chandulal and then sold to Waiata Publishing in 2003. The magazine was owned by the Bauer Media Group. The former owner was APN Specialist Publications NZ Limited. Bauer Media acquired it from APN in 2013.

The magazine covered the latest news, celebrity interviews, fashion trends, skincare and beauty, competitions and quizzes. It also gave useful advice to young girls about body image, friend situations and health. The magazine also featured about 5 posters in each issue.

Creme ceased publication with the last issue on 25 August 2014.

== Team ==
The editorial staff included:

Kristina Rapley; editor, Amber Wijnstok;deputy editor, Anna Saveleva; designer, Louise Logan; fashion editor

and previously:

Alice O'Connell, editor; Emma Clifton, assistant editor; Emma Hepburn, art director; Virginia Brown, fashion & beauty editor; and Lisa Taylor, designer.

== Creme Girl Ambassadors ==
Since early 2008, Creme ran yearly competitions for girls who want to be the next Creme girl ambassador. The winner received her own monthly column in the magazine and her own interview.

List of Creme Girl Ambassadors:

- 2008 - Christina Shewan
- 2009 - Gini Letham
