= Cream soda (disambiguation) =

Cream soda is a soft drink.

Cream soda also may refer to:

- an early computer project by Steve Wozniak
- "Cream Soda", a song from Exist album by Exo, 2023
- Cream Soda (band), Russian musical group
- Cream soda, a Japanese ice cream float using melon soda

== See also ==
- Cherry Cream Soda
- Ice cream soda
