= Creme de la Creme =

German hip hop group

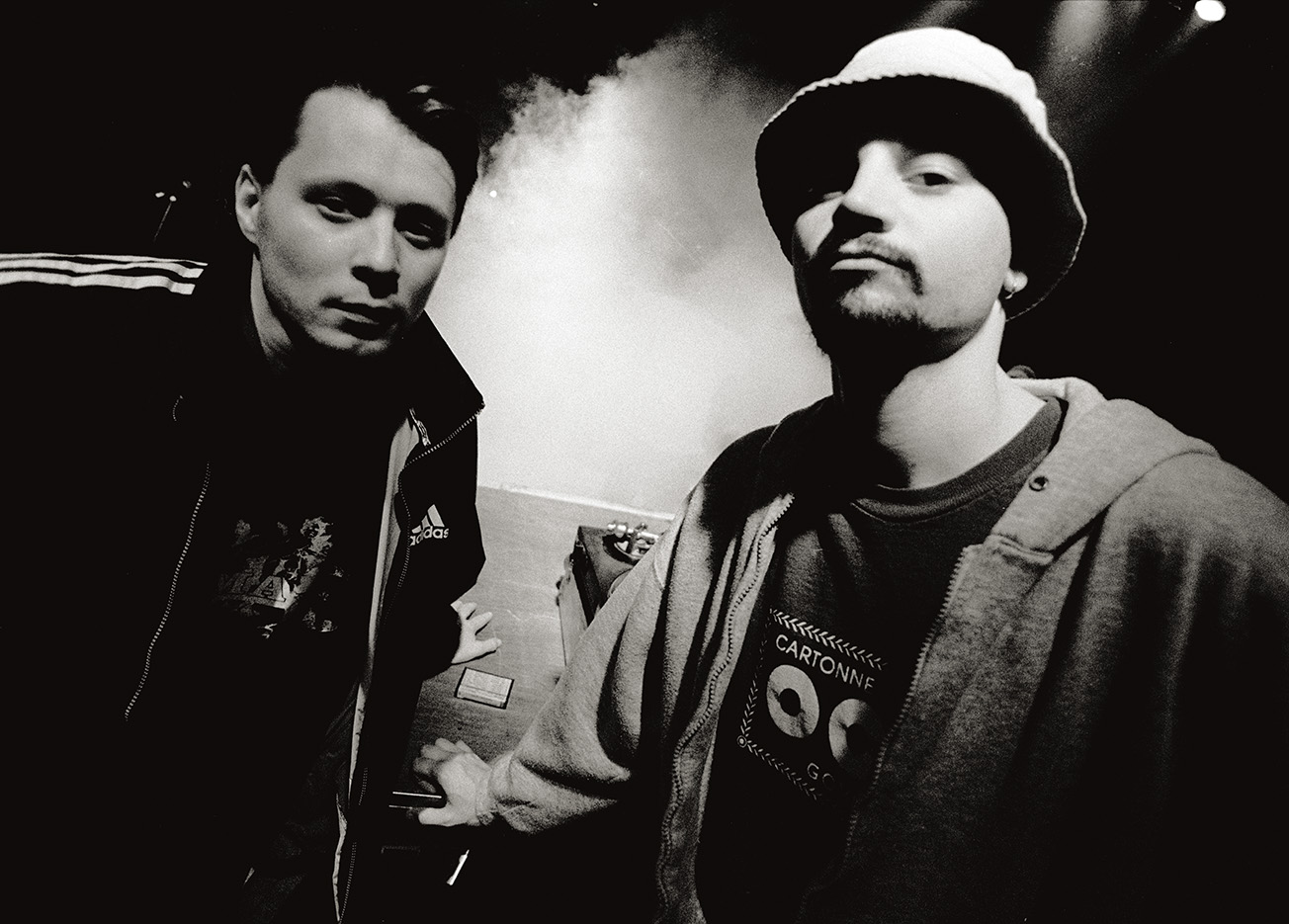

Background information
- Origin: Cologne, Germany
- Genres: Hip hop
- Years active: 1997–2000
- Members: Te; DJ Dr. Chris; FutureRock

Creme de la Creme was a German hip hop group from Cologne, Germany.

== History ==
The group was founded in 1997 and consisted of the trio Te, DJ Dr. Chris and FutureRock, who has also produced the more famous German groups Die Fantastischen Vier and Gentleman. Their first successful EP Bitte hau mich nicht (Please do not hit me) was released in 1997. Its sale had to be discontinued because it insulted German hip hopper Moses P. who had hit comedian Stefan Raab and had broken his nose bone. Creme de la Creme is best known for their single “Letzte Nacht” (“Last Night”) which reached #71 in the German single charts in 1998. One year later they released their first and only album Porno Funk.

== Discography ==
- 1997: Bitte hau mich nicht (EP)
- 1998: Letzte Nacht (Single)
- 1998: Ich Lehne Mich Zurück (Single)
- 1999: Porno Funk (Album)
- 1999: Einer von vielen / Haschisch Kakalake (Single)
- 1999: Diese Zeilen (Single)
- 2000: Best of (Album)
