= Upper crust =

Upper crust most commonly refers to:

- The upper class in modern societies; the social class composed of the wealthiest members of society, who also wield the greatest political power

Upper crust may also refer to:

- Upper Crust (restaurant chain), a chain of European baguette (sandwich) restaurants
- Upper Crust Pizzeria, a pizza chain in Boston
- The Upper Crust, a Boston-based hard rock band
- Crust (geology), the earth's (or another body's) geological solid outer shell
