= Crème =

Crème (or creme) is a French word for 'cream', used in culinary terminology for various preparations, including:

- Cream, a high-fat dairy product made from milk from a cow
- Custard, a cooked, usually sweet mixture of dairy and eggs
- Crème liqueur, a sweet liqueur
- Cream soups (French: potages crèmes), soups containing dairy cream

== See also ==
- Cream (disambiguation)
