= Falla monument =

Type of Spanish artistic monument

A Falla or monumento fallero is an artistic monument, usually large (three to twenty meters in height, sometimes higher) composed of figures called ninots, which typically encircle one or more bigger central figures, called remates. The fallas are placed in the streets during the Falles festival in Valencia (Spain), and in other towns with festivals inspired by it. The monument usually deals with a satirical subject connected with recent news or public controversies, and is covered in posters with words, verses and statements of a humorous nature. The monument is made with combustible materials (cardboard, wood, paper, clothing, expanded polystyrene, etc.) which are then burned in the streets after being on show for a few days.

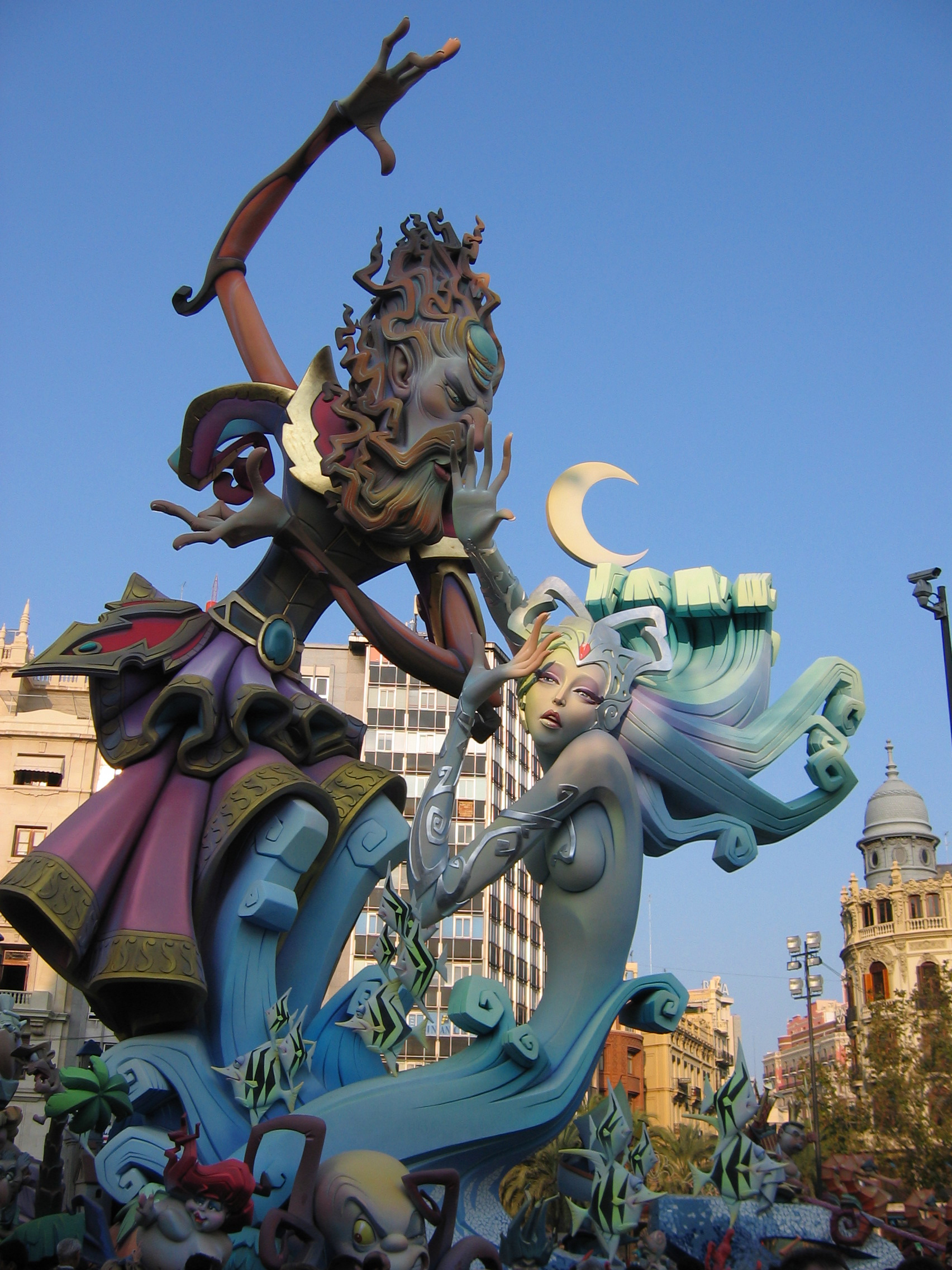
Falla in Valencia.

== Origin and evolution ==
In medieval Valencian the word Falla named the torches that were placed on top of watchtowers. This word is derived from Latin Facula, torch. In the Llibre dels feits, it is stated that the troops of King James I of Aragon carried Fallas to light their way.

The material origin of the monumento fallero was burning waste from carpenters and private homes. That is to say, it came from popular festivities and those of local guilds. It was often children who, on the eve of Saint Joseph's festivity, patron saint of the woodworkers guild, made the collection with things such as cattail chairs, old furniture, brooms or grass mats on the eve of Saint Joseph's festivity, patron saint of the woodworkers guild.

In this, the fallas festivity was not very different from the Hogueras de San Juan (for example those in Alicante), which are held throughout Europe or the bonfires of Hogueras de San Antonio also very typical of Valencia too.

The specific quality of the Fallas comes from the fact that it is a festival of particular neighbourhoods in which locals take the opportunity to criticize each other. With the creation of the first, very rudimentary, figures, came the burlesque, satirical posters. These criticisms were often directed at the municipal power, the church or the state.

This first stage of the festivity ranges from its uncertain beginnings to the last decades of the nineteenth century. In those days the ninots were made of waste, paper, wood and cardboard.

It is around the turn of the century when the first ninots with a cloth body and a head and hands made of wax appeared. The creation of these takes a lot more work so we can say that the figure of the fallero artist is born. This period lasts until the 1920s–1930s. There is at this stage a transformation in the festivity, with the appearance of mold cardboard figures.

This technique allowed for the building of higher monuments and it has come down almost to the present day, where it is still used, especially for smaller ninots and fallas of lower budgets. An advantage inside the disadvantage of the mold technique is the possibility of making the same ninot indefinitely. Therefore, the fallas with bigger budgets made original molds every year, which were used by others at a lower price the following years. Finally, from 1990s appeared the technique of expanded polystyrene or Styrofoam. Its lighter weight allows for more height in the monuments, and requires greater innovation in design.

== Construction of the figures ==
As the monuments can be very high (often more than 10 meters), a specific technique has been developed to build them. The step is to prepare a draft and perhaps a scale model which must be approved by the comisión fallera (a committee formed by a group of people who support or finance a falla in a neighborhood of Valencia) who hires the artist.

The structure (scaffold) is constructed of wood and then all materials (cardboard, wax, cloth, etc.) are used. Though years ago they could use wire, currently these materials are prohibited by the Junta Central Fallera (which regulates and coordinates this festivity). Ninots are traditionally constructed from molds, which are usually made of plaster, and are filled with pulp, which are painted after drying.

But today, for convenience and ease of use, new materials are used, such as porespan, resin or fiberglass. These new materials make the monuments lighter and the Falla artists can take risks to create bold and innovative forms.

=== Criticism of new materials ===
Many people criticize these new materials, referred to as white cork, since the black smoke they give off during the burning of the monument means the combustion can't be seen clearly. The pollution that these new materials cause has also been criticised in comparison with the supposedly lighter pollution from traditional materials. The Polytechnic University of Valencia carried out a study which seems to prove that, on the contrary, white cork is less polluting than the traditional materials. The student of Fallas Manuel Sanchis Ambrós carried out a study in which he assured that even though the combustion of cork gave off more heat, the combustion of wood and liquid materials used in making a wood structure is clearly more polluting. A few years later (2013), the same university went back to the traditional method of falla making in view of its greater environmental sustainability.

=== Experimental changes in the Fallas ===
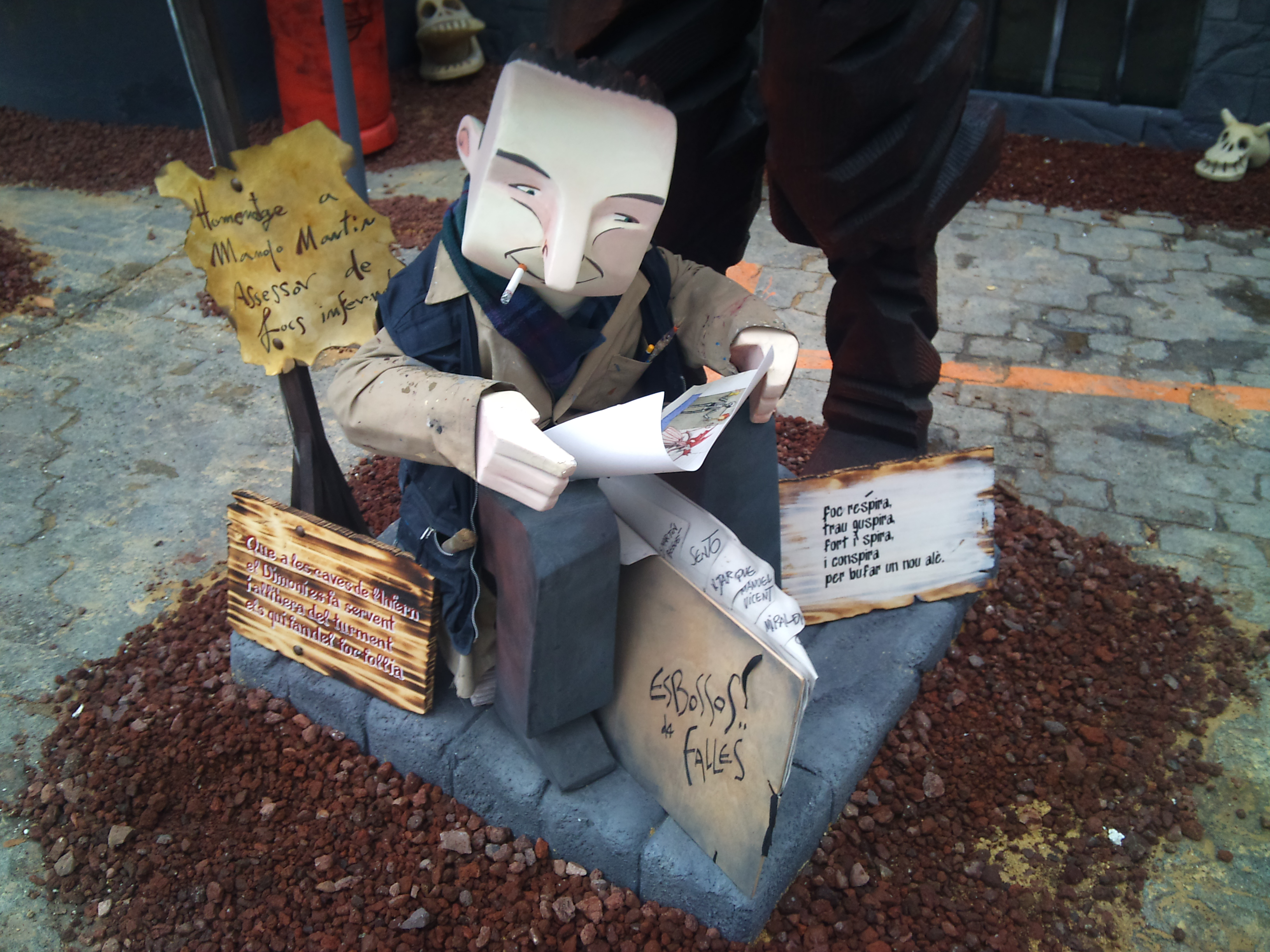
Ninot in tribute to Manolo Martín López, built in the 2011 Na Jordana monument by his son Manuel Martín Huguet with designs by Sento Llobell.

During the 80's, it was, above all, the Valencia City Hall Square Falla—formerly known as the Valencian Community Falla, it's the only one made entirely with public money and so, it doesn't participate in the official competition—that introduced a series of experimental changes. The cartoonist Sento Llobell and the designer Francis Montesinos, who dressed up ninots, collaborated with the artist Manolo Martín. From this period, we recall Fallas such as that which recreated the façade of the Valencia CIty Hall or the crane that excavated the ground, finding thousands of objects.

== Parts of a Falla ==
Although there's not a single method to make a Falla, traditionally it has been divided in the scenes at the bottom representing different situations, usually critical of an event, and bigger dolls making up the central body. Signs with some Valencian rhymes show the broad theme. The remate, which represents the general theme of it, is usually a figure placed on the bigger one standing at the centre of the Falla. The special section Fallas, the most important section, does not follow that exact pattern and usually have more than one remate.

== Fallas themes ==
The themes of the Fallas have changed throughout history. In the beginning, they served to criticize what happened in the neighborhoods or dealt with issues of a very local nature. But, little by little, sometimes in a hidden manner, they started to criticize people who were important locally. Since the Spanish transition to democracy the Fallas have turned to more global topics. Nowadays they criticize political and social issues from each community, national or global point of view. However, there are many Fallas which make use of their satirical purpose in order to criticize banal topics like TV shows, celebrities, etc.

== Types ==
Each Comisión fallera erects a large Falla and a children's one. The latter has small measurements and the ninots are smaller. Similarly, children's Fallas make use of their satirical and ironic nature in a less acute form. Children's Fallas also receive awards.

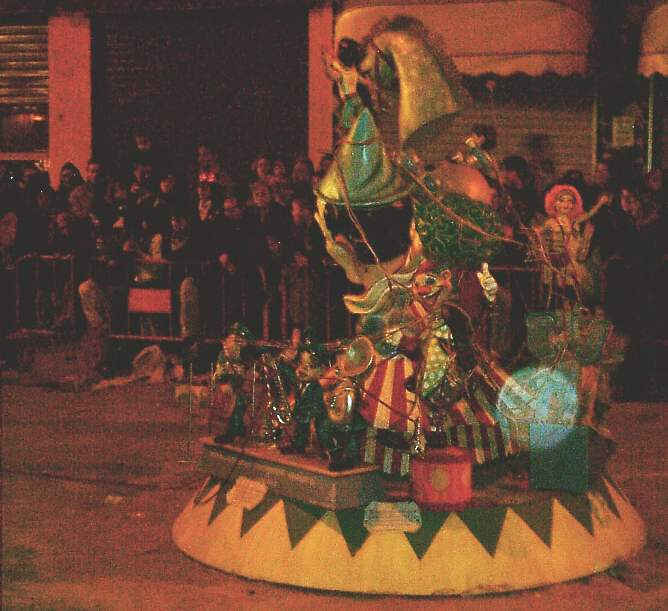
Photography of a children's Falla.

== Awards ==
The Fallas monuments receive different prizes according to the categories of the Fallas and the subject matter. The most valued prize of all categories is the First Prize of all Sections. The most important prizes of each section are the first prize of section, the first one in inventiveness and grace, and the first prize to the alternative Falla. Furthermore, Generalitat Valenciana, Diputación de Valencia, Bonfires of Saint John and Junta Gestora de la Magdalena, as well as other private entities also give their own prizes which often include a sum of money.

== See also ==
- Falles
