= Almond cultivation in California =

Aspect of almond industry

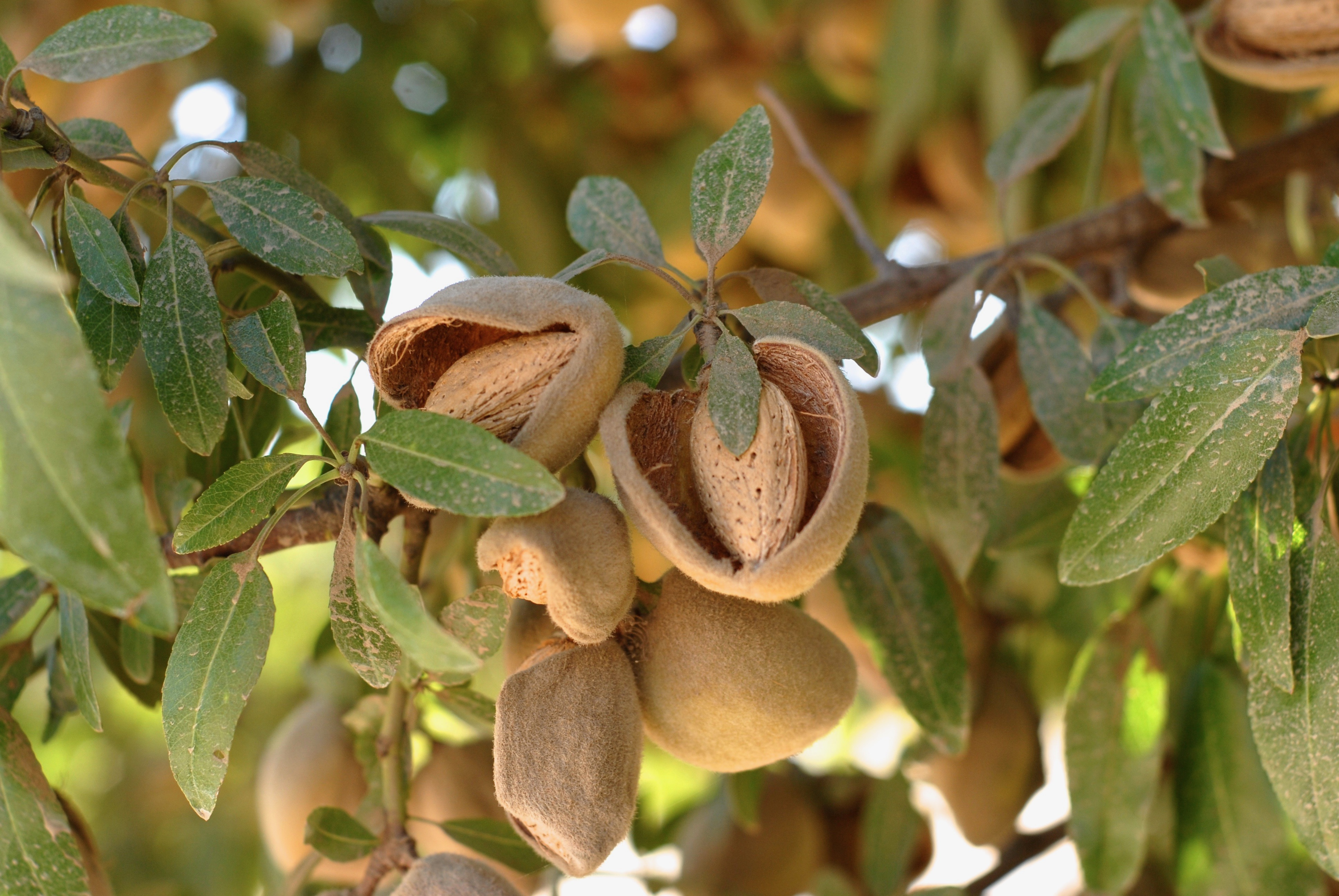
San Joaquin Valley

California produces 80% of the world's almonds and 100% of the United States commercial supply. Although almonds are not native to California, a hot, dry Mediterranean climate and developed water infrastructure create favorable conditions for commercial cultivation of the crop.

Almonds are the state's most valuable export crop. Farmers exported $4.9 billion worth to foreign countries in 2019, about 22% of the state's total agricultural exports, with the European Union, China and India as leading destinations.

California almond farms import the majority of US commercial bee colonies to the state of California during the almond pollination season. Almond production in California is the source of several major environmental problems, including high demand for water and abundant waste of almond shells. As of 2021, due to a historic long-term drought in California, production was forecast to decline, and many almond orchards were being abandoned.

Shipping disruptions, reductions in consumer spending, and trade disputes during 2020-21 caused by the COVID-19 pandemic affected logistics and pricing of almonds.

== Economic impact ==
Almonds were California's fifth most valuable agricultural product in 2022, accounting for $3.5 billion of agricultural output. Almond production increased from 703 million pounds (319 kt) in 2000 to 2.27 billion pounds (1.03 Mt) in 2017. USDA NASS data indicates that bearing acreage has continued to increase in early 2020, reaching 1.39 million acres in 2025. However, nursery sales reports published by USDA NASS also showed a declining estimated planted acreage for new orchards between 2021 and 2024.This suggests a slowdown in new plantings. The 2024 nursey report shows a declining rate in planted acreage, from 43,000 acres in 2021-2022 to 31,000 in 2022-2023 and 17,000 to 5,000 over those same periods. Prices rose over the same period, fueled in part by overseas demand. Newly planted almond acreage has displaced more traditional cash crops, such as cotton.

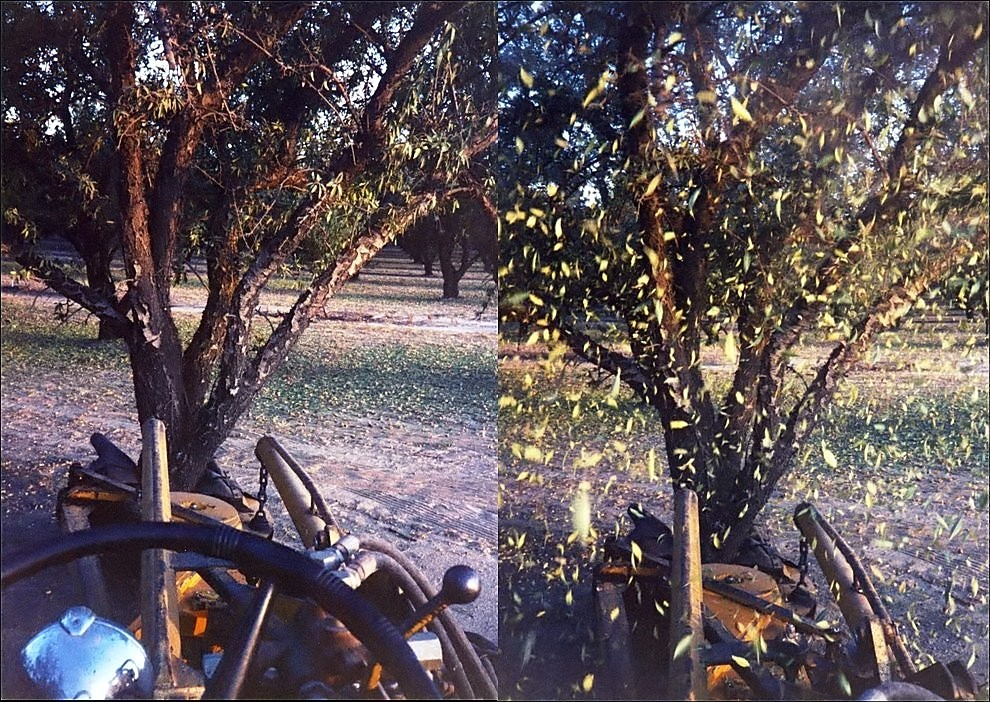
Almonds being harvested with a tree shaker

In addition to consumer demand, the industry's growth has benefitted from mechanization. During the harvesting process, tree shakers are used to aggressively shake each almond tree, causing the nuts to fall to the ground. This reduces the need for labor relative to other crops, which has attracted farmers who are concerned with shortages of migrant workers.

A 2014 report commissioned by the Almond Board of California, an industry group, found that the industry directly employed 21,000 people and indirectly supported an additional 83,000 jobs statewide. Including indirect effects, the industry added about $11 billion to the state's GSP.

=== Exports ===
Almonds are California's most valuable export crop. Farmers exported $4.5 billion worth to foreign countries in 2016, about 22% of the state's total agricultural exports. The majority of these exports went to the European Union, China and India. While the EU is the largest consumer, the latter two countries are expanding markets where the state's Almond Board has actively marketed the nuts as a healthy snack.

As part of the 2018 China–United States trade war, China has imposed a 50% tariff on almonds. As a result, some Chinese businesses have resorted to importing almonds from other producers in Africa and Australia.

During the global supply chain disruption, shipping companies placed a lower priority on products that paid lower shipping rates resulting in various exports being delayed. More than three-quarters of the containers leaving Los Angeles were empty in July 2021 whereas about two-thirds of the containers leaving U.S. ports are typically filled with exports. Many of containers were going back empty due to the rush by shippers to bring in imports of back-to-school supplies and fall fashions from Asia. This impacted the almond growers along with Midwestern farmers who ship to customers overseas.

== Environmental issues ==
=== Bees ===
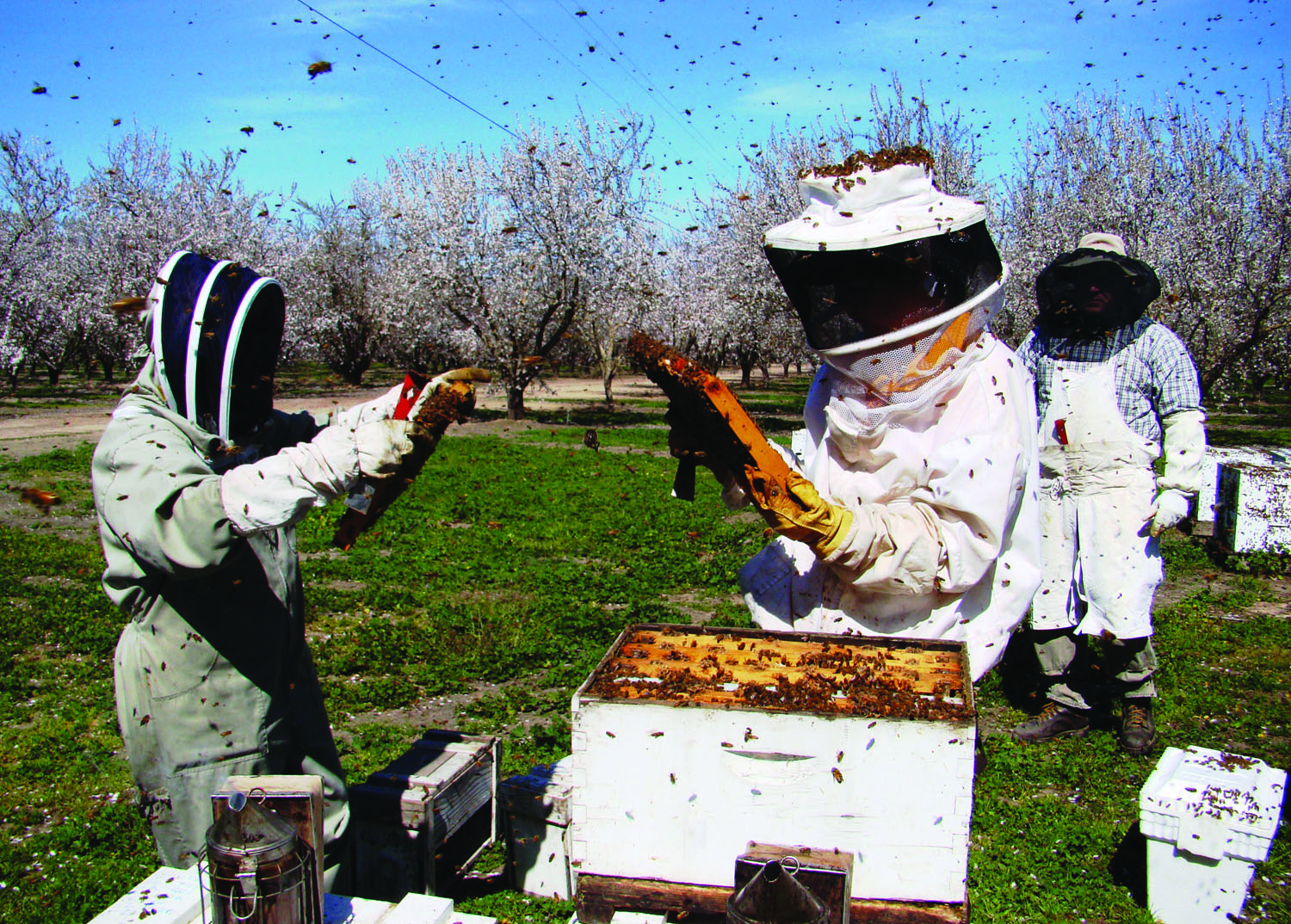
Beekeepers in a California almond orchard

Like many crops, almond cultivation requires cross-pollination. Although almonds can be pollinated by many insects, commercial almond farming is heavily dependent on honey bees. Commercial almond growers may rent hives during the blooming season to ensure pollination success. Starting in 2006, California almond growers began to suffer losses due to colony collapse disorder, a poorly understood phenomenon resulting in the decline of bee populations. While this increased pollination expenses for many growers, high demand for almonds created an incentive to transport bees from across the United States to California. The state's bee population has since partly recovered, and in 2018 accounted for more than half of all bee colonies in the United States.

=== Water ===
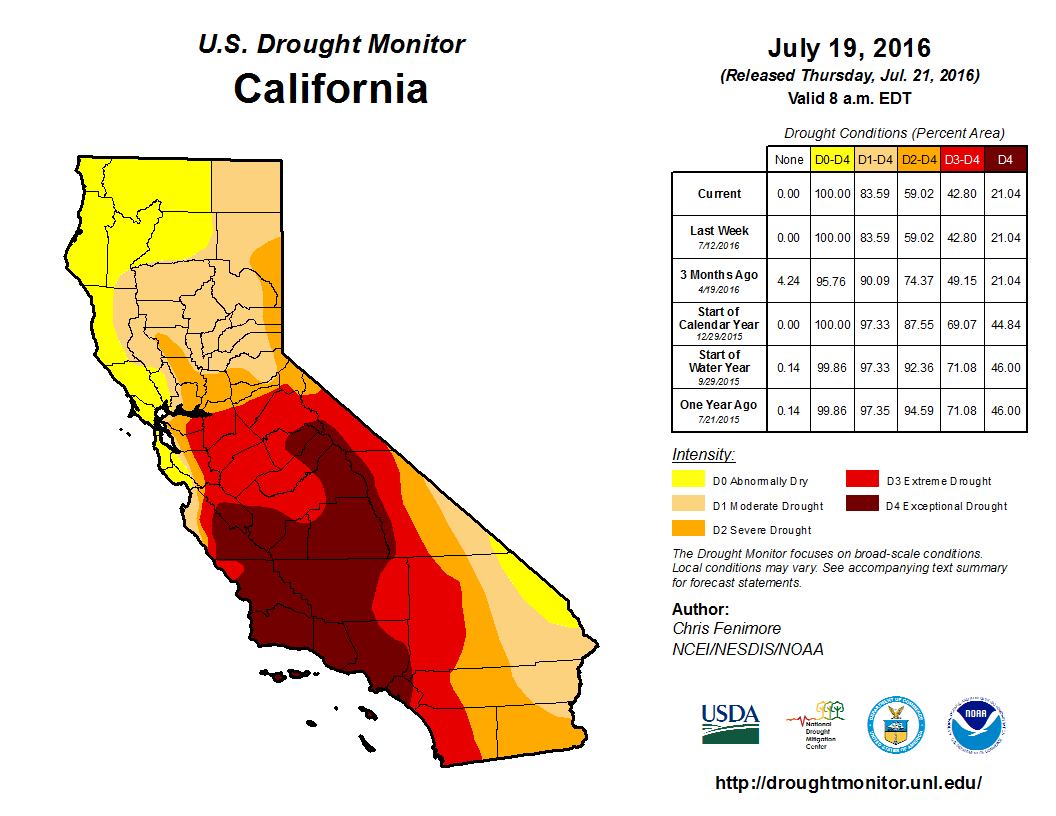
California drought status, July 19, 2016

California suffered a severe drought from 2011 to 2017. In addition to economic consequences for the state's almond growers, the industry came under criticism for its water use. As of 2015, almond cultivation consumed about 10% of the state's water. Furthermore, almond acreage increased by 14% from 2007 to 2014, while almond irrigation increased by 27%. Critics have pointed out that the state's 6,000 almond farmers use roughly 35 times the amount of water as the 466,000 residents of Sacramento.

To supplement reduced deliveries from the state's water system, many almond farmers increased groundwater pumping, which can unsustainably deplete aquifers and cause land subsidence.

Almond production fell somewhat as a result of the drought, contributing to higher prices and dampening consumer demand. To compensate, many farmers removed older, less-productive almond trees and replaced them with newer plantings that use less water. Since these trees will take about five years to become productive, some farmers have expressed concerns about a future almond surplus.

=== Waste products ===
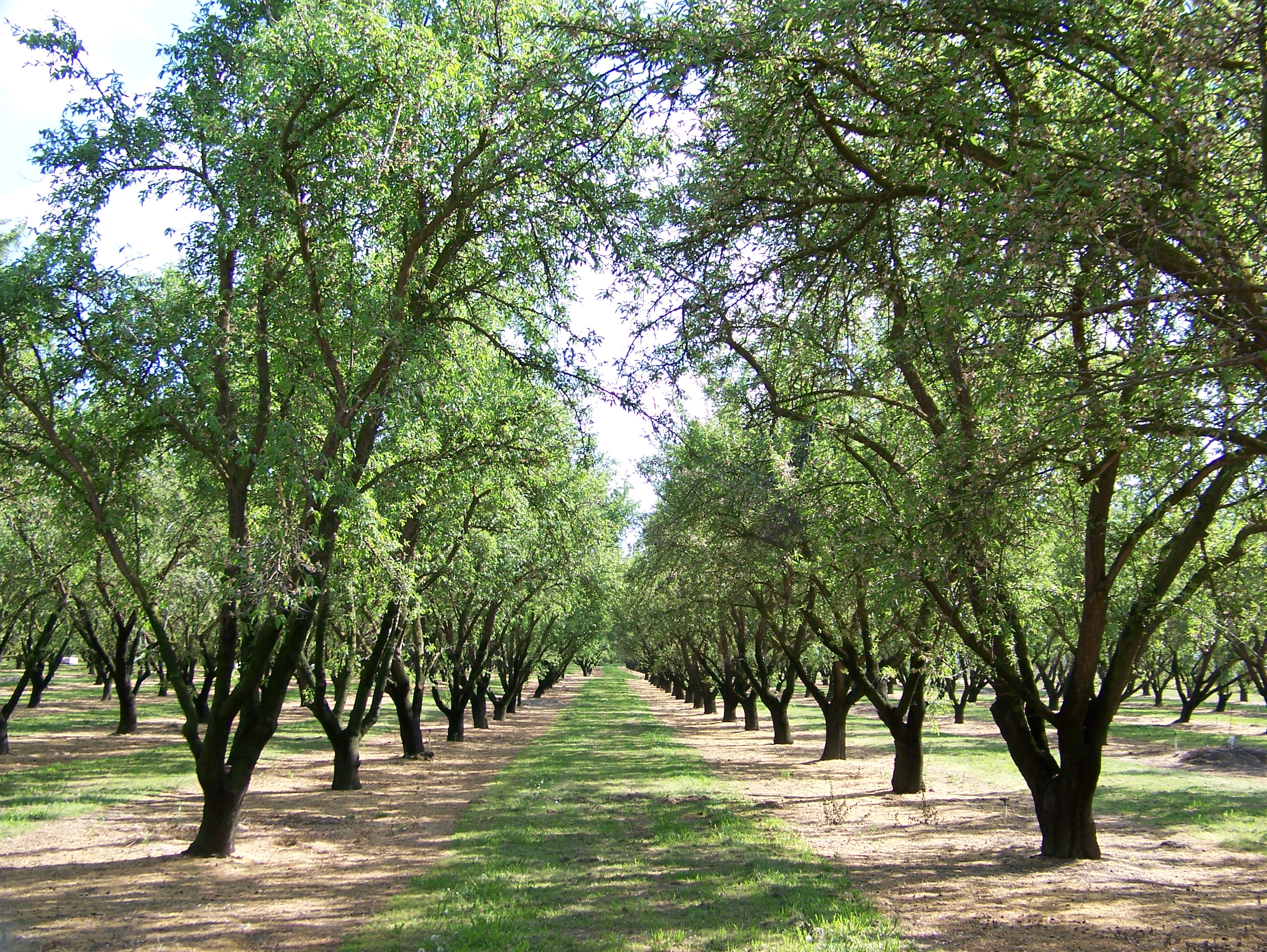
An orchard in Winton, California

In the 2015/2016 crop year, the California almond industry produced over 1.5 million metric tons (1,500,000 long tons; 1,700,000 short tons) of hulls and over 0.5 million metric tons (490,000 long tons; 550,000 short tons) of shells. Historically, these byproducts have been used for livestock feed and bedding, or as fuel for cogeneration plants. However, declining demand for these uses combined with an increasing supply of almonds has created a mismatch. The Almond Board of California, an industry association, has researched ways to incorporate almond byproducts into other industries such as food, automotive, and pharmaceuticals.

One possible use investigated by the Board is feedstock for bioenergy. For example, biochar made from almond shells can be integrated into automobile and plane tires, allowing them to better resist changing temperatures. Biochar can also be used to make stronger, biodegradable plastic goods such as garbage bags and flower pots.

A similar sustainability initiative has been "whole orchard recycling". At the end of their productive life, whole almond trees are ground up and the remains are integrated back into the soil, which retains the tree's nutrients. This process also increases the soil's ability to hold water.

== Pests ==
Ferrisia gilli is an economically significant pest of almond in California. F. gilli was formerly known as a California population of F. virgata (the striped mealybug), only being studied sufficiently to recognize that it is distinguishable from F. virgata due to its severe impact on pistachio and almond in this state. Xanthomonas pruni (syn. X. campestris pv. pruni, syn. X. arboricola pv. pruni) was unknown here until detection in Sacramento and northern San Joaquin Valley in the spring of 2013. Amyelois transitella (the misnamed navel orangeworm) is one of the worst pests of this crop here. Because larvae are unable to bore through the hull, early adults oviposit into the previous year's fallen wasted almonds (mummies) and then attack the new crop in mid-June or early July when the hulls split.

== See also ==
- California nut crimes
- California Almond Growers
