= Entrance of the flower =

The Entrance of the flower (Valencian: L'entrà de la flor, Spanish: La entrada de la flor) is celebrated on 1 February in Torrent, Valencian Community, Spain. The traditional Entrance of the flower is a deep-rooted festivity in the municipality that traces back to the 17th century, in which the clavarios and members of the Confrerie of the Mother of God deliver a branch of the first-blooming almond-tree to the Virgin.

== Origins ==
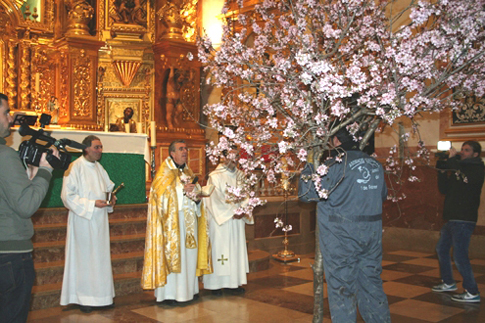
L'entrà de la Flor

Celebrated on February 1, this is perhaps the showiest rite of the Confrerie. It consists in offering to the Virgin Mary the fruits of the first tree to flower after the winter, that is, the almond tree.

The oral tradition says that "this is a century-old celebration in Torrent. However, it does not know its precise origin, nor when exactly the Confrerie of the Virgin of Rosario and Saint Lluís Gonzaga became its organiser, although our Record of Refundación of the year 1940 sample that one of our obligations, from the foundation of the Confrerie, is to offer the novelties that the nature sends us".

This branch short and brings until the parish of Sant Lluís Bertran, where will initiate the transfer at night.. Once done this, celebrates a breakfast and a multitudinous food in the call "Caseta of Rosario". There they go clavarios, managerial board, friends and participants of the act and even municipal authorities

The second and primary part of the entrada is from 20:45. The participants in the transfer gather at the parish of Sant Lluís Bertran, where they offer a brief prayer and then transfer of the almond branch to the parish of Our Lady of the Assumption. This procession launches rockets attached with pinzas, which makes this act was full of colour and is very pleasant to see.

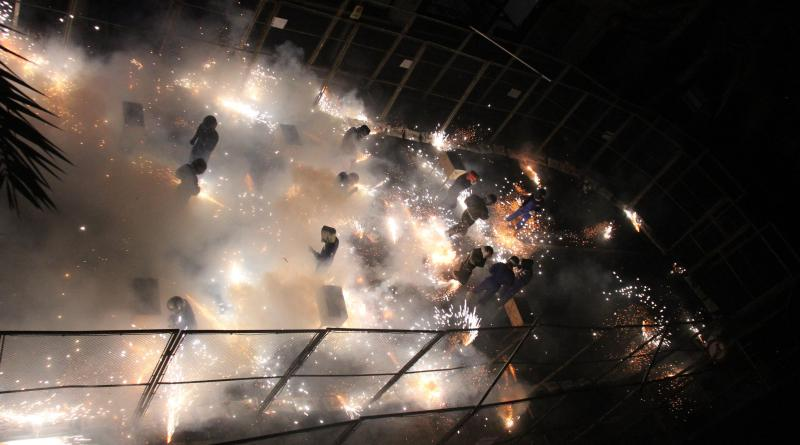
The Polvora lights Torrent

Finally, in the parish of the Assumption, the rector of this temple blesses the branch and offers some branches to the Virgin of Rosario. Once it finalises the transfer begins the Cordà. In an enclosed enclosure and conditioned, the participants launch loose rockets.

To participate in the Cordà will be indispensable to possess the certificate of Consumer Recognised like Expert (CRE). The participants, so much in the first part of the act (route from the Saint parish Luis Bertrán until the parish The Assumption of Our Lady) as in the Cordà, have to possess the mentioned certificate.

== Other celebrations ==
Throughout the year a number of festivities are being celebrated in the greater area of Torrent.

- Porrat of Saint Antonio Abad is celebrated on 16–17 January. The day before of 17 January a bonfire is lit in the street and two or three weeks later makes the back blessing of animals, beside the delivery of breads blessed.
- Saint Blas: On 3 February, in this festivity remain installed in the Ramón y Cajal street put of craftsmanship, food, nuts, etc. A date in which they sell the typical gaiatos (claves of rosquilleta or of panquemao) and the sanblaiets. It is also traditional to go to the church to receive oil on the throat (since Saint Blas is the saint that protects from the illnesses of the throat). The typical dish of the day is the rossejat.
- Torrent's Fallas: Celebrated between 15 and 19 March. The 28 commissions falleras plant 56 fail (28 greater and 28 childish), that beside the 2 municipal do that Torrent have 58 fail. Some fifteen days before the festivity of Saint Joseph, makes the traditional Cridà (call to all the world to remember that they already are fail). Until the day 15 there are several acts like the cabalgatas and the exhibition of the ninot... The night of the day 15 plant fail them; from 16 until 19 (both included) makes the mascletà; the days 17 and 18 makes the Offering to the Virgin of Desamparados; on 19 (Saint Joseph), makes the cremá of fail them.
- Saint week of Torrent: The acts of Semana Santa begin a week before the Sunday of Bouquets, in which it makes the proclamation of the Saint Week and the proclamation of the Queen of the Meeting. The Sunday of Bouquets makes the blessing of palms. The Monday, Tuesday, Wednesday, and Saint Thursday, make the "transfers", in which each fraternity carries his "step" until the parish of Mountain Sion or the museum of Saint Week.
- Virgin parties of Desamparados. They celebrate the second Sunday of May, where the image of the Virgin of Desamparados visits the streets of the city.
- Corpus Christi: The festivity of the Body of Christ is used to celebrate to finals of May and mediated of June. During the day of the Corpus celebrates the greater mass and in the afternoon holds a procession. When #finish the procession makes the shot of a mascletà.
- Parties Patronales (Saint Abdón and Saint Senén) and of Moors and Christians: From 23 to 30 July. Popular party that from 1990 has taken a big importance by the Moors and Christians. The Big Entrance has 24 filás and comparsas with more than one thousand participants and nearly ten thousand viewers each summer. Besides they make other activities like the proclamation and the trabucà in which it does the parlament.
- Parties of summer of the districts of Torrent: During the months of August and September celebrate the parties of the distinct neighbourhoods and colonies of Torrent; like the White Colony of the Vedat of Torrent (devoted to the White Virgin), Saint Cayetano (in the neighbourhood of the same name), Tros Alt (devoted to the Virgin of the Angels), The Marsh (devoted to the Virgin of Desamparados), But of the Muntanyeta, Parties of the association Montehermoso, Parties of the Colony of Saint Apolonia in the Vedat of Torrent, Parties But of the Jutge (devoted to Saint Lluís Bertrán and Saint Vicente Ferrer).
- Aurora Celebration that begins on 8 December with the end to summon to the people for the pray of Rosario. This celebration makes all the Sundays (to exception of 25 December and 1 January) from 8 December until 6 January, also makes a aurora 26 January.
