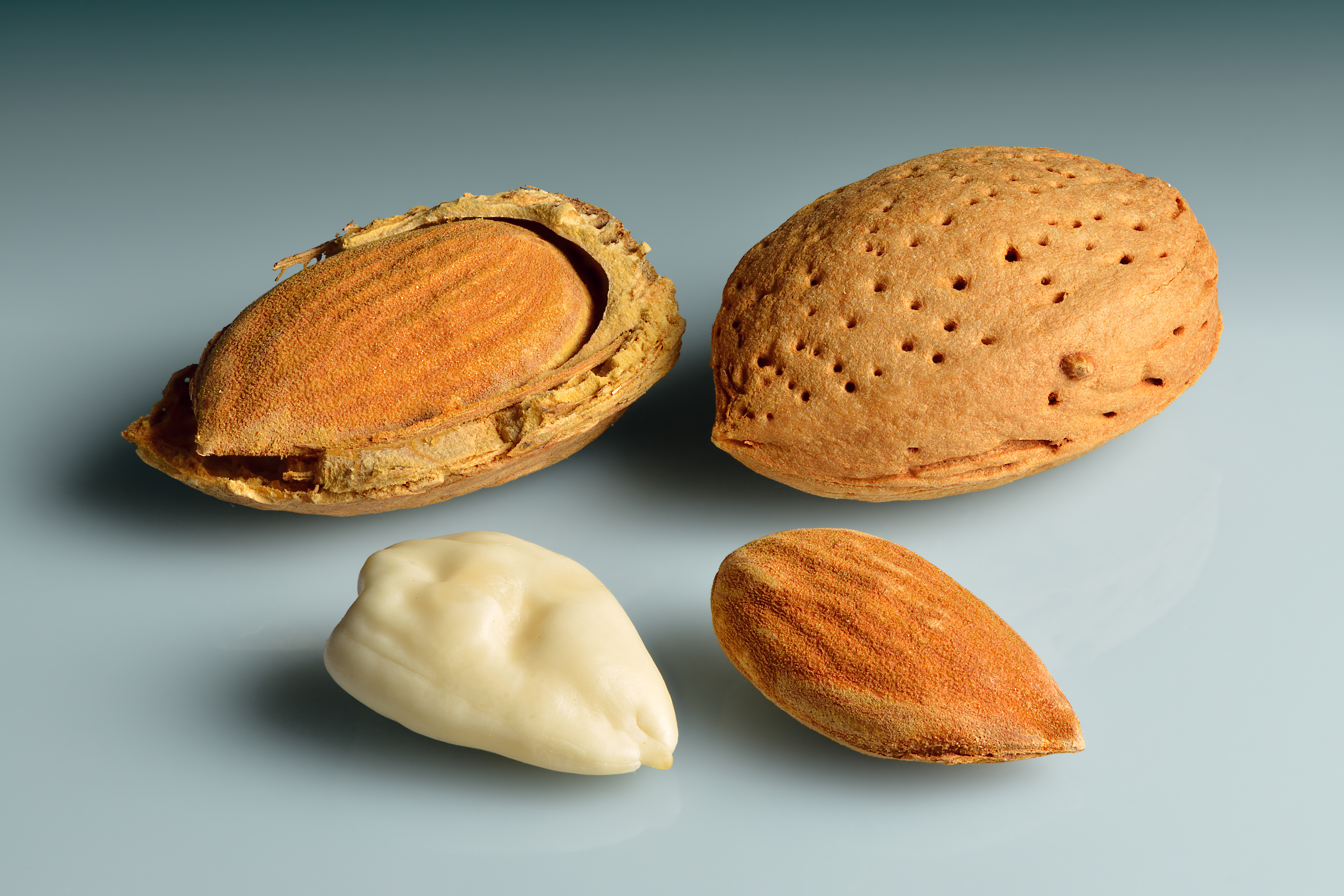
- Clockwise from top left: almonds with shell cracked open, shelled, unshelled, and blanched seed
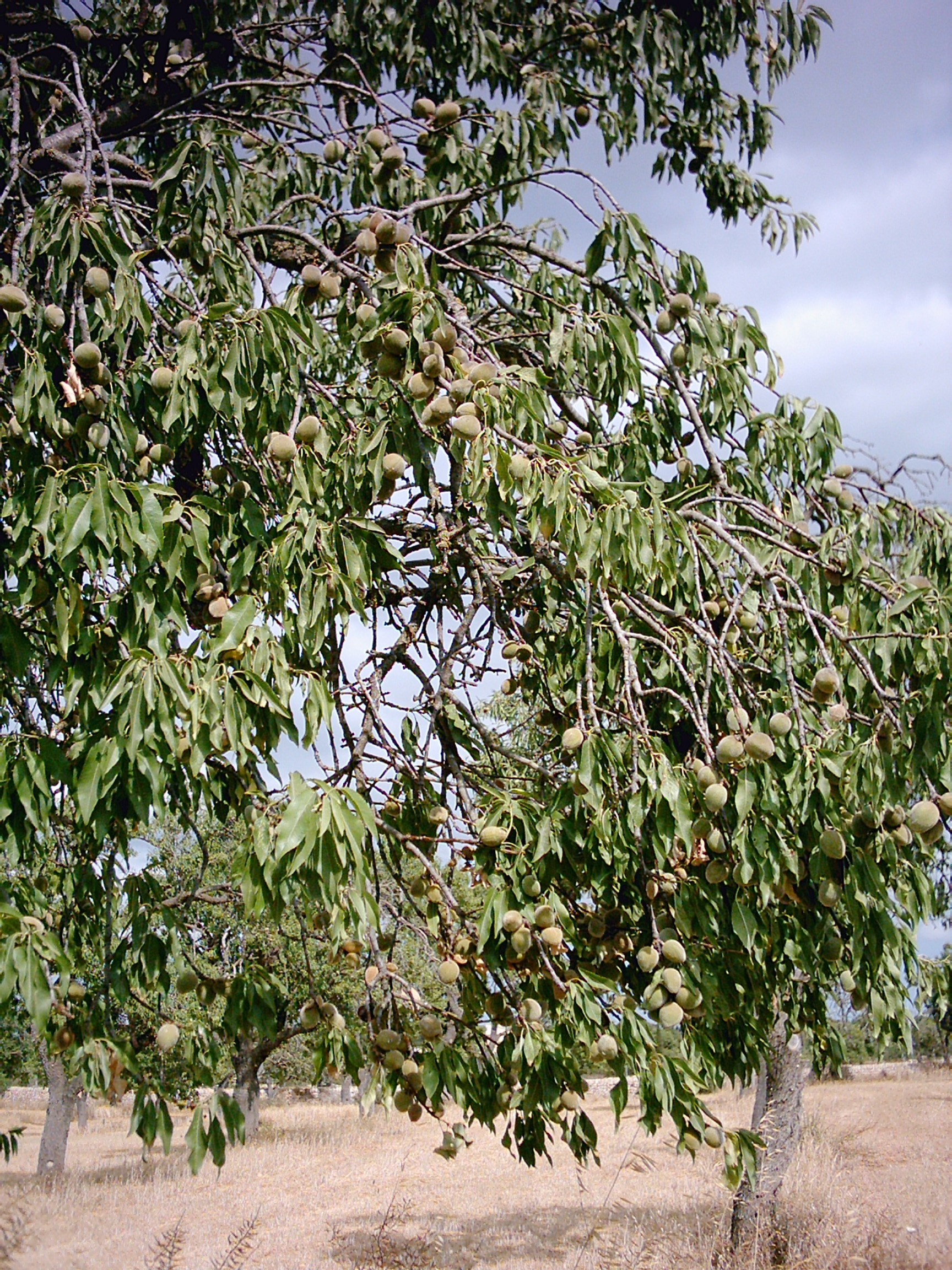
- Almond tree with ripening fruit

Scientific classification
- Kingdom: Plantae
- Clade: Tracheophytes
- Clade: Angiosperms
- Clade: Eudicots
- Clade: Rosids
- Order: Rosales
- Family: Rosaceae
- Genus: Prunus
- Subgenus: Prunus subg. Amygdalus
- Species: P. amygdalus

Binomial name
- Prunus amygdalus Batsch, 1801

Synonyms
- Replaced syn.: Amygdalus communis L., 1753; Homotypic: Amygdalus amygdalus (Batsch) Frye & Rigg, 1912 nom. illeg.; Druparia amygdalus (Batsch) Clairv., 1811; Prunus communis (L.) Arcang., 1882 nom. illeg.; Heterotypic: Amygdalus amara Duhamel, 1768; Amygdalus amygdalina Oken ex M.Roem., 1847; Amygdalus cochinchinensis Lour., 1790; Amygdalus communis var. fragilis Ser., 1825; Amygdalus communis var. macrocarpa Ser., 1825; Amygdalus decipiens Poit. & Turpin, 1830; Amygdalus dulcis Mill., 1768; Amygdalus elata Salisb., 1796; Amygdalus korshinskyi var. bornmuelleri Browicz, 1974; Amygdalus sativa Mill., 1768; Amygdalus sinensis Steud., 1840; Amygdalus stocksiana Boiss., 1856; Persica Mill., 1754; Prunus cochinchinensis (Lour.) Koehne, 1915; Prunus dulcis (Mill.) D.A.Webb, 1967 nom. superfl.; Prunus dulcis var. amara (Duhamel) Buchheim, 1972; Prunus dulcis var. fragilis (Ser.) Buchheim, 1972; Prunus dulcis var. spontanea (Korsh.) Buchheim, 1972; Prunus intermedia A.Sav., 1882; Prunus stocksiana (Boiss.) Brandis, 1906; Trichocarpus Neck., 1790

= Almond =

Species of nut

The almond (Prunus amygdalus, syn. Prunus dulcis (Mill.) D.A.Webb, nom. illeg. non Prunus dulcis Rouchy) is a species of tree from the genus Prunus. Along with the peach, it is classified in the subgenus Amygdalus, distinguished from the other subgenera by corrugations on the woody shell (endocarp) surrounding the seed.

The fruit of the almond is a drupe, consisting of an outer hull and a hard shell with the seed, which is not a true nut. Shelling almonds refers to removing the shell to reveal the seed. Almonds are sold shelled or unshelled. Blanched almonds are unshelled almonds that have been treated with hot water to soften the outer skin, which is then removed to reveal the white embryo. Once almonds are cleaned and processed, they can be stored for around a year if kept refrigerated; at higher temperatures they will become rancid more quickly. Almonds are used in many cuisines, often featuring prominently in desserts, such as marzipan.

The almond tree prospers in a moderate Mediterranean climate with cool winter weather. It is rarely found wild in its original setting. Almonds were one of the earliest domesticated fruit trees, due to the ability to produce quality offspring entirely from seed, without using suckers and cuttings. Evidence of domesticated almonds in the Early Bronze Age has been found in the archeological sites of the Middle East, and subsequently across the Mediterranean region and similar arid climates with cool winters.

California produces about 80% of the world's almond supply. Due to high acreage and water demand for almond cultivation, and need for pesticides, California almond production may be unsustainable, especially during the persistent drought and heat from climate change in the 21st century. Droughts in California have caused some producers to leave the industry, leading to lower supply and increased prices.

== Description ==
The almond is a deciduous tree growing to 3–4.5 metres (10–15 feet) in height, with a trunk of up to 30 centimetres (12 inches) in diameter. The young twigs are green at first, becoming purplish where exposed to sunlight, then grey in their second year. The leaves are 8–13 cm (3–5 in) long, with a serrated margin and a 2.5 cm (1 in) petiole.

The fragrant flowers are white to pale pink, 3–5 cm (1–2 in) diameter with five petals, produced singly or in pairs and appearing before the leaves in early spring. Almond trees thrive in Mediterranean climates with warm, dry summers and mild, wet winters. The optimal temperature for their growth is between 15 and 30 °C (59 and 86 °F) and the tree buds have a chilling requirement of 200 to 700 hours below 7.2 °C (45.0 °F) to break dormancy.

Almonds begin bearing an economic crop in the third year after planting. Trees reach full bearing five to six years after planting. The fruit matures in the autumn, 7–8 months after flowering.

The almond fruit is 3.5–6 cm (1 3/8–2 3/8 in) long. It is not a nut but a drupe. The outer covering, consisting of an outer exocarp, or skin, and mesocarp, or flesh, fleshy in other members of Prunus such as the plum and cherry, is instead a thick, leathery, grey-green coat (with a downy exterior), called the hull. Inside the hull is a woody endocarp which forms a reticulated, hard shell (like the outside of a peach pit) called the pyrena. Inside the shell is the edible seed, commonly called a nut. Generally, one seed is present, but occasionally two occur. After the fruit matures, the hull splits and separates from the shell, and an abscission layer forms between the stem and the fruit so that the fruit can fall from the tree. During harvest, mechanised tree shakers are used to expedite fruits falling to the ground for collection.

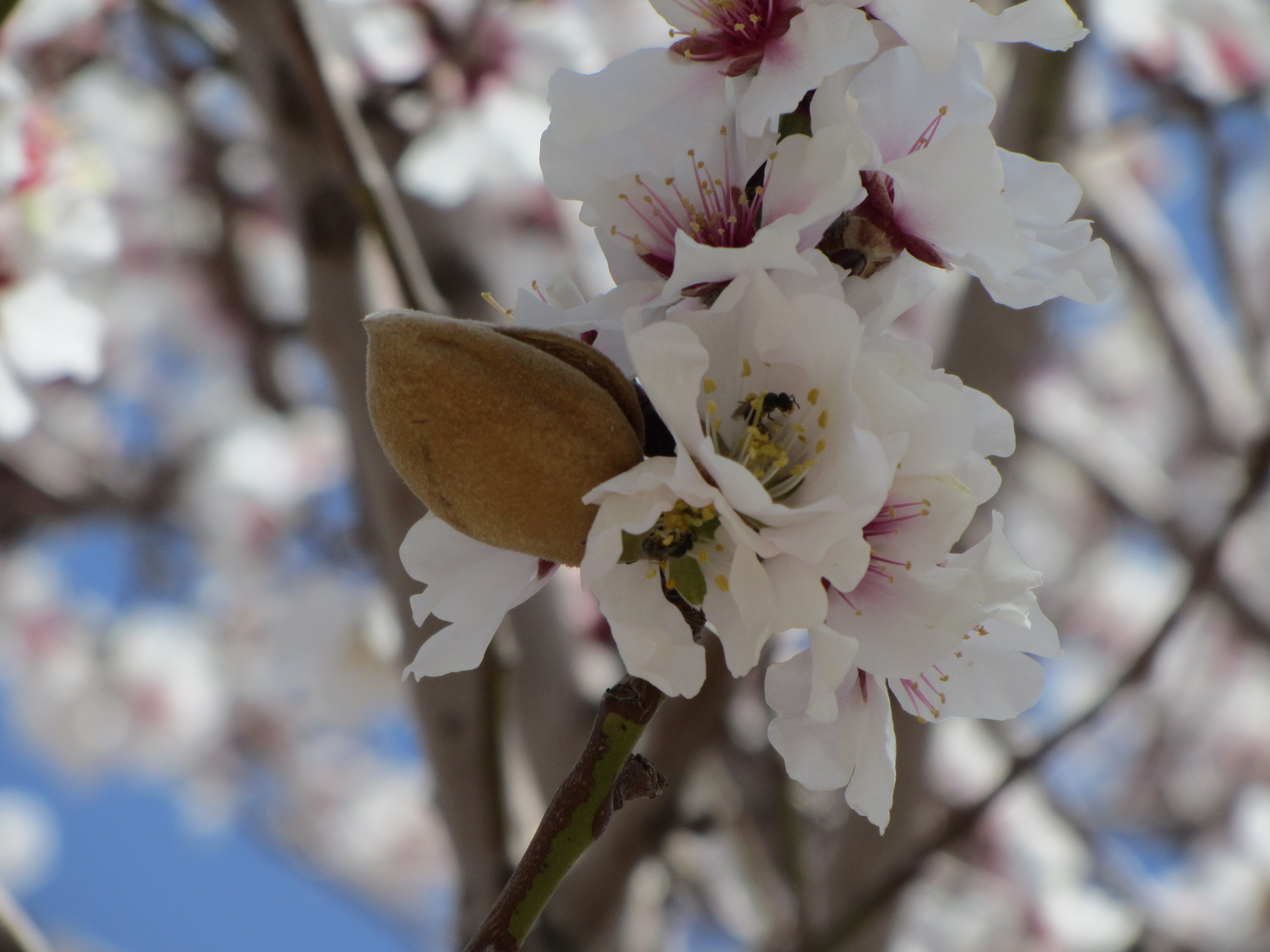
Almond blossoms

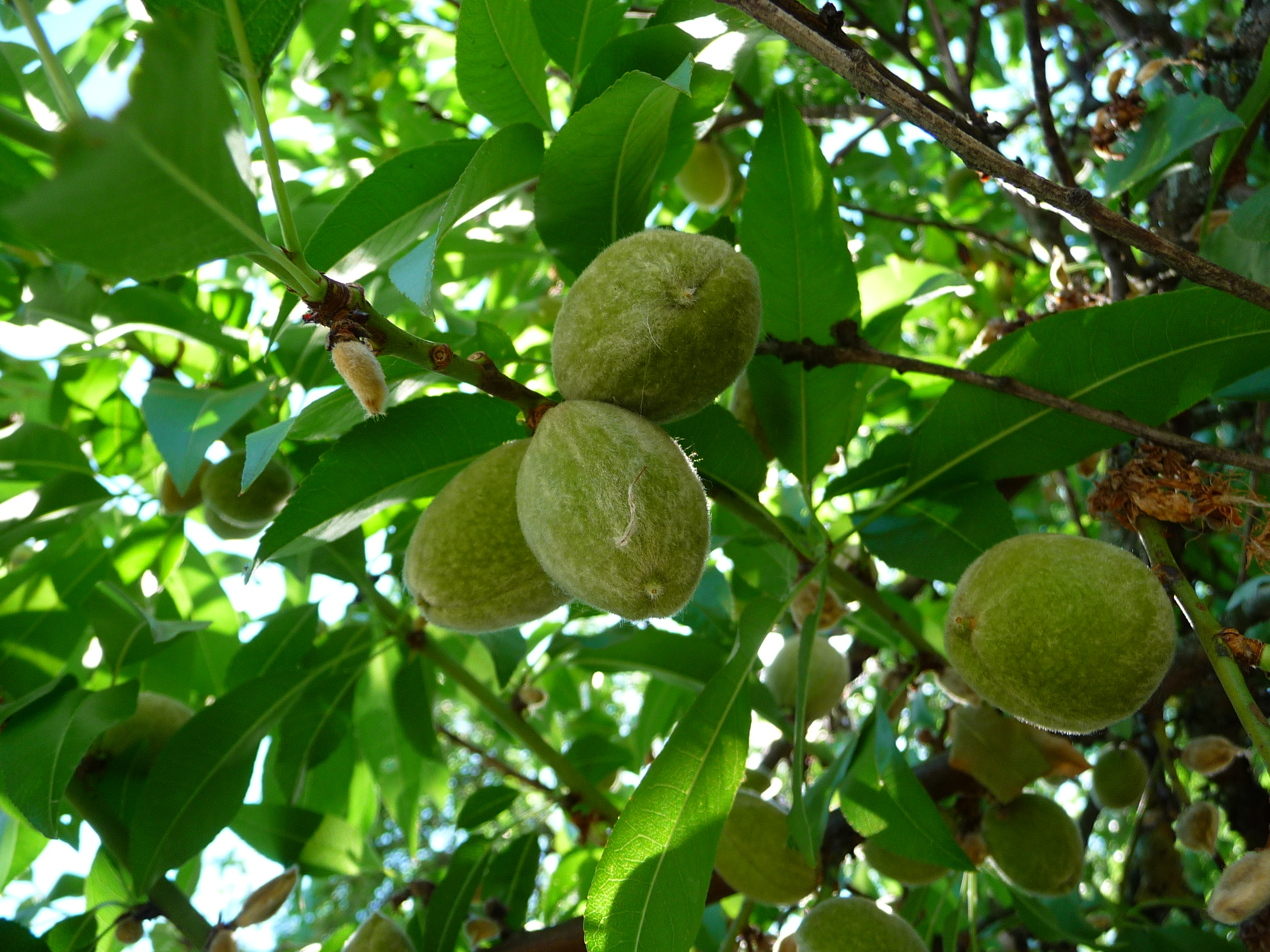
Young almond fruit

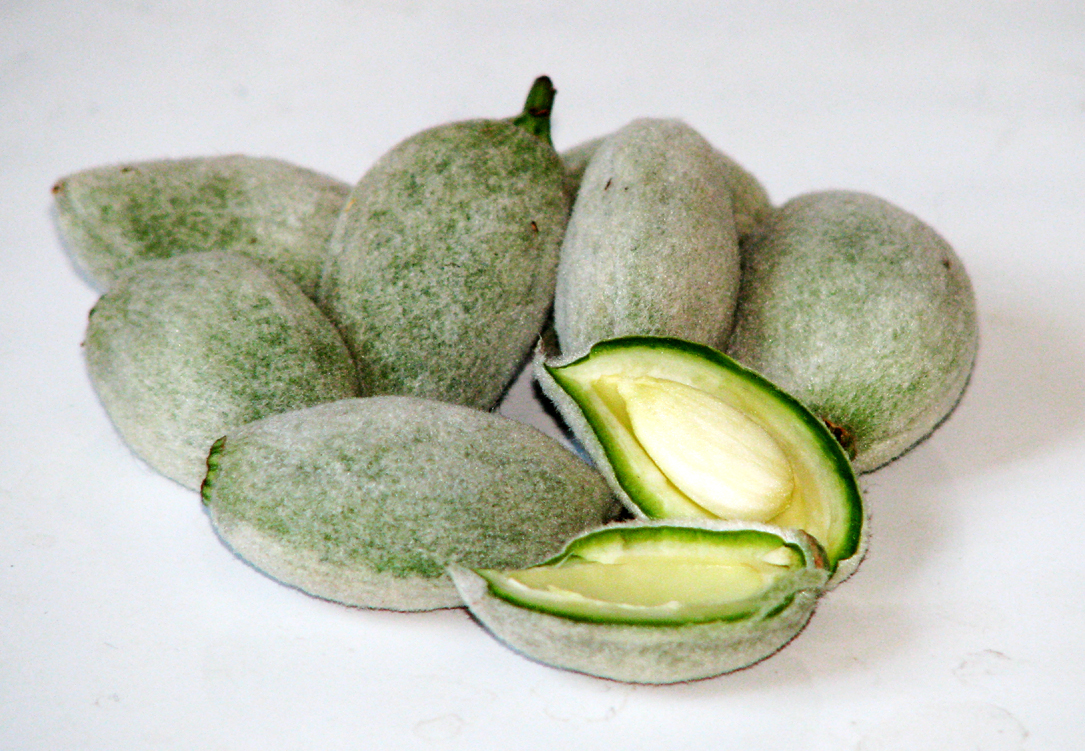
Green almonds

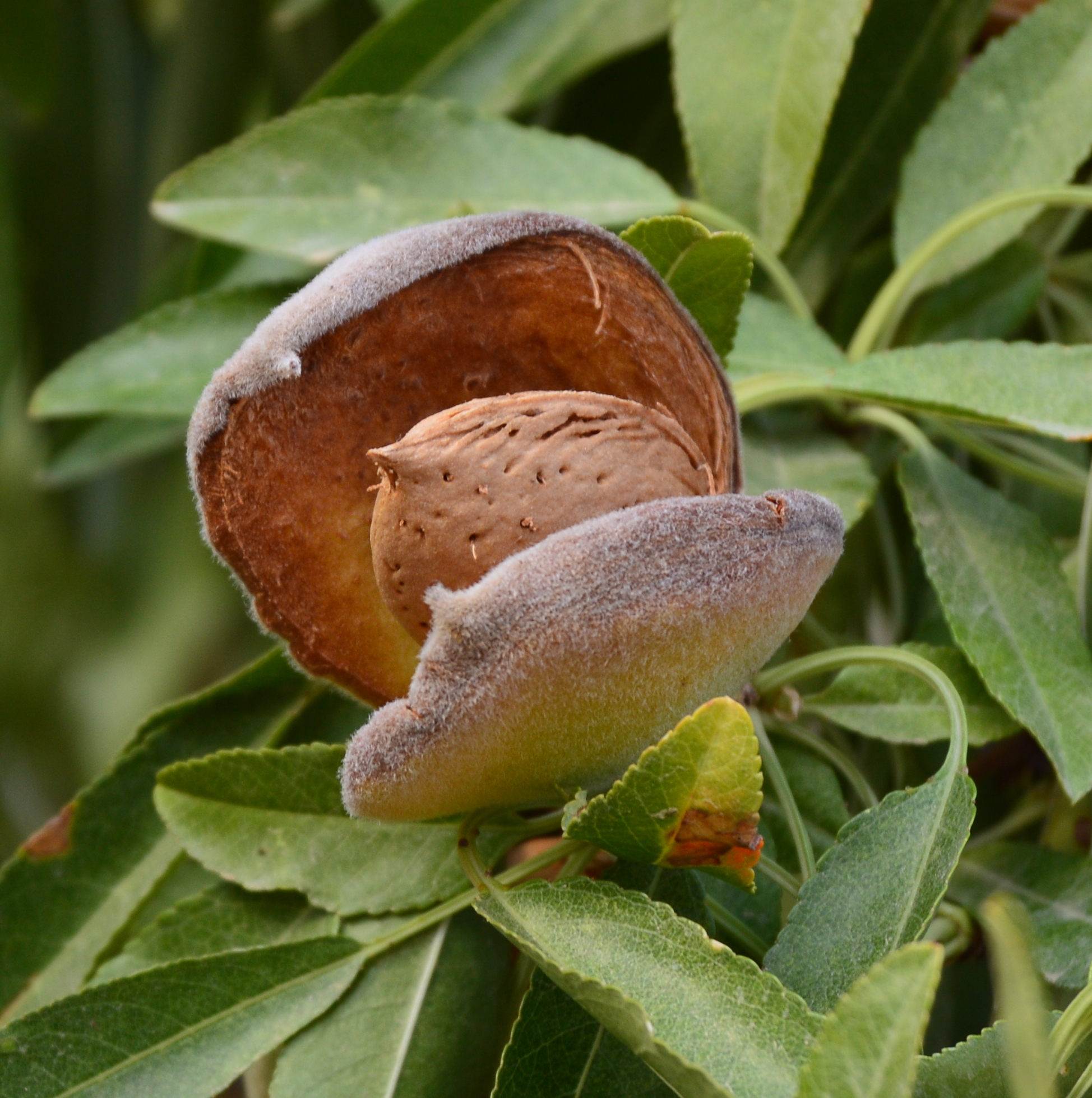
Mature almond nut

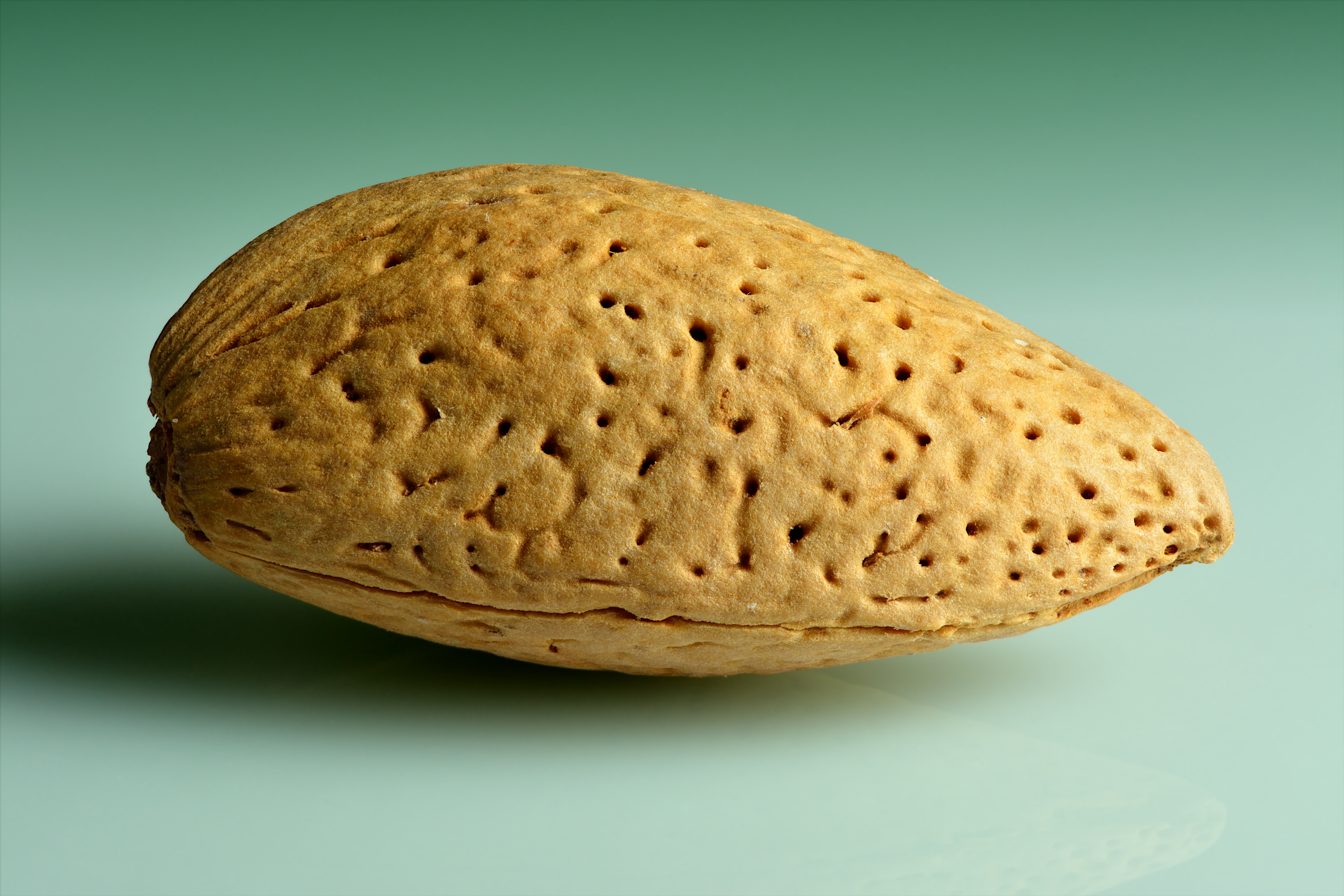
Almond shell

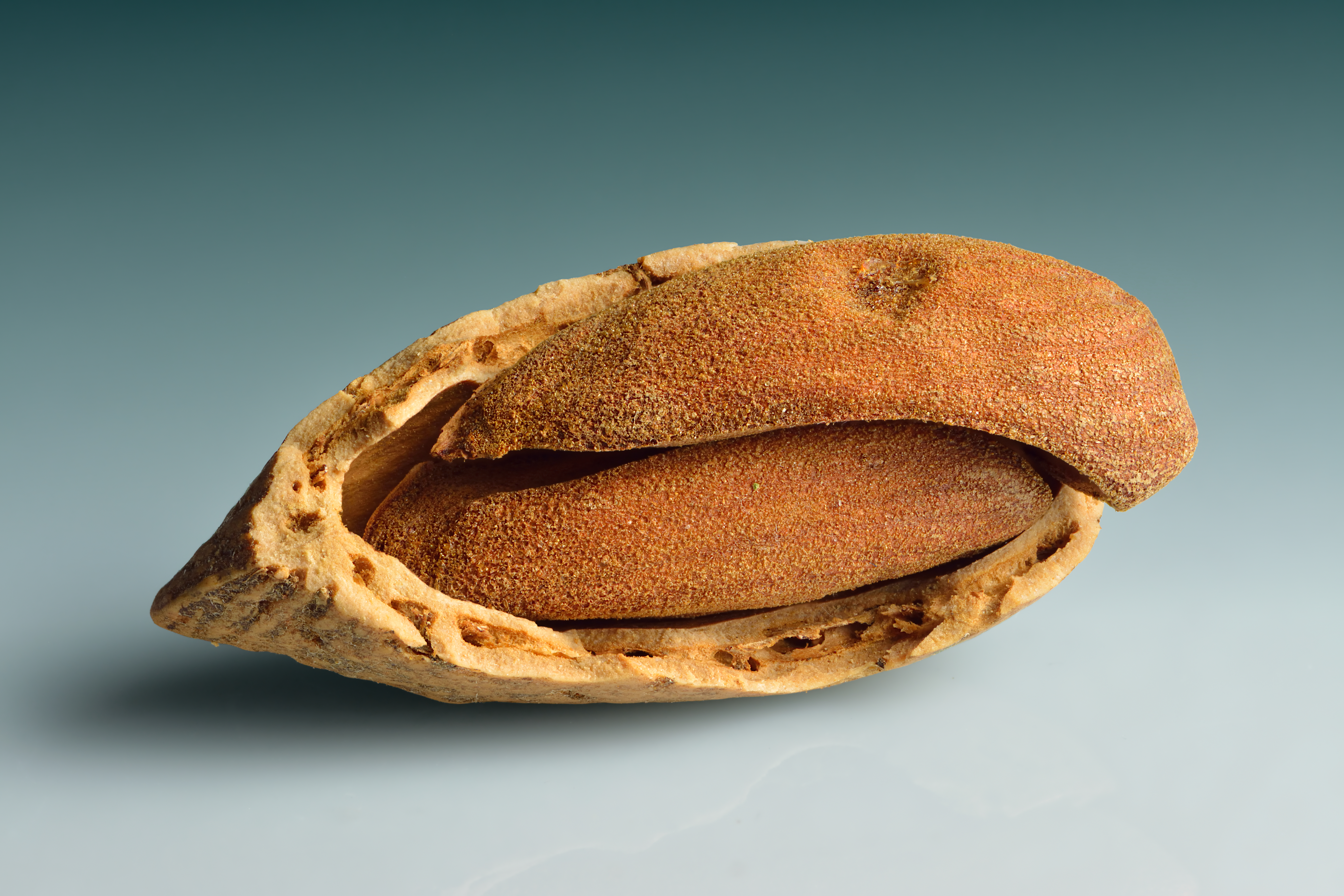
A rare double-seeded shell

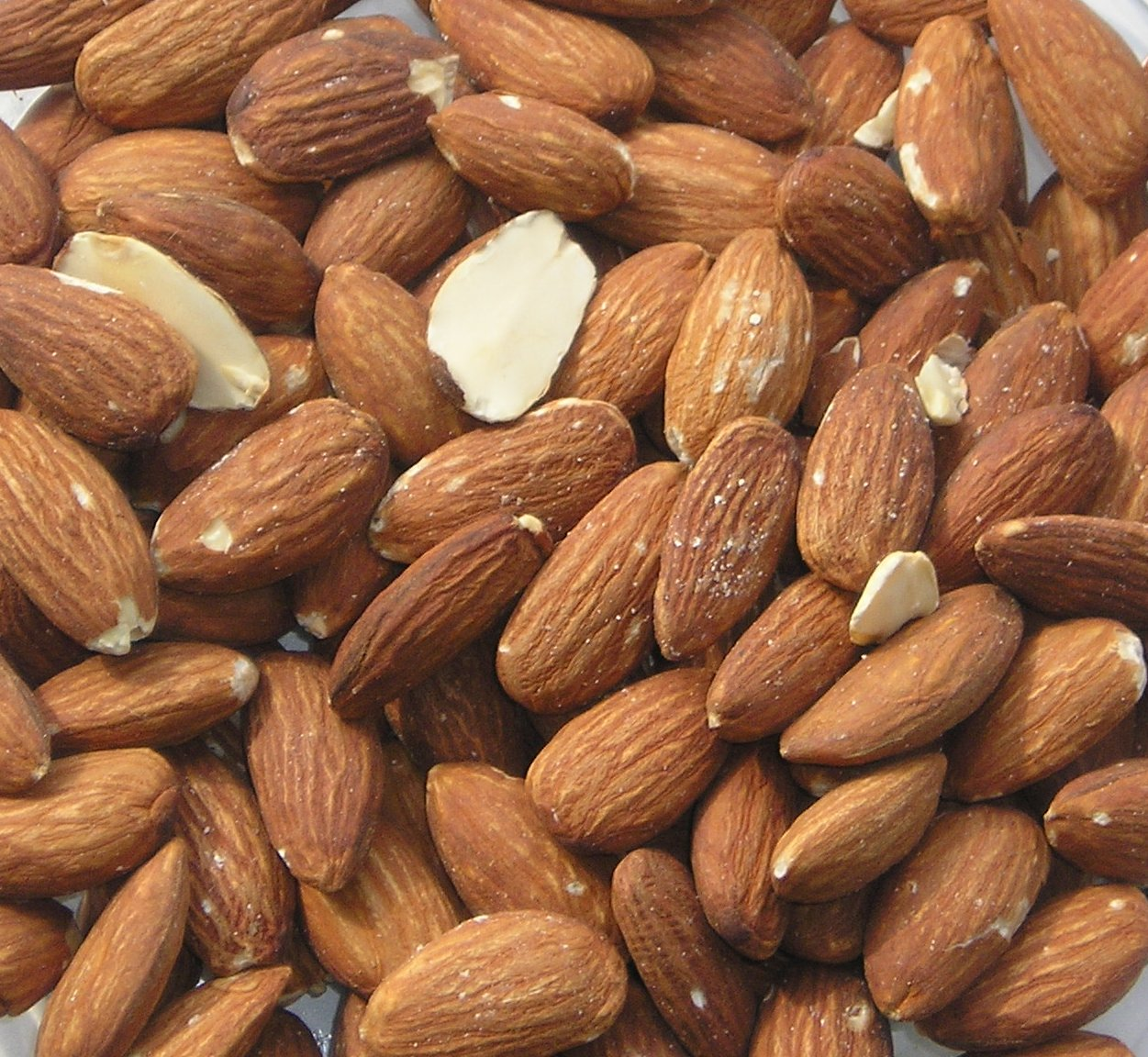
Harvested almonds

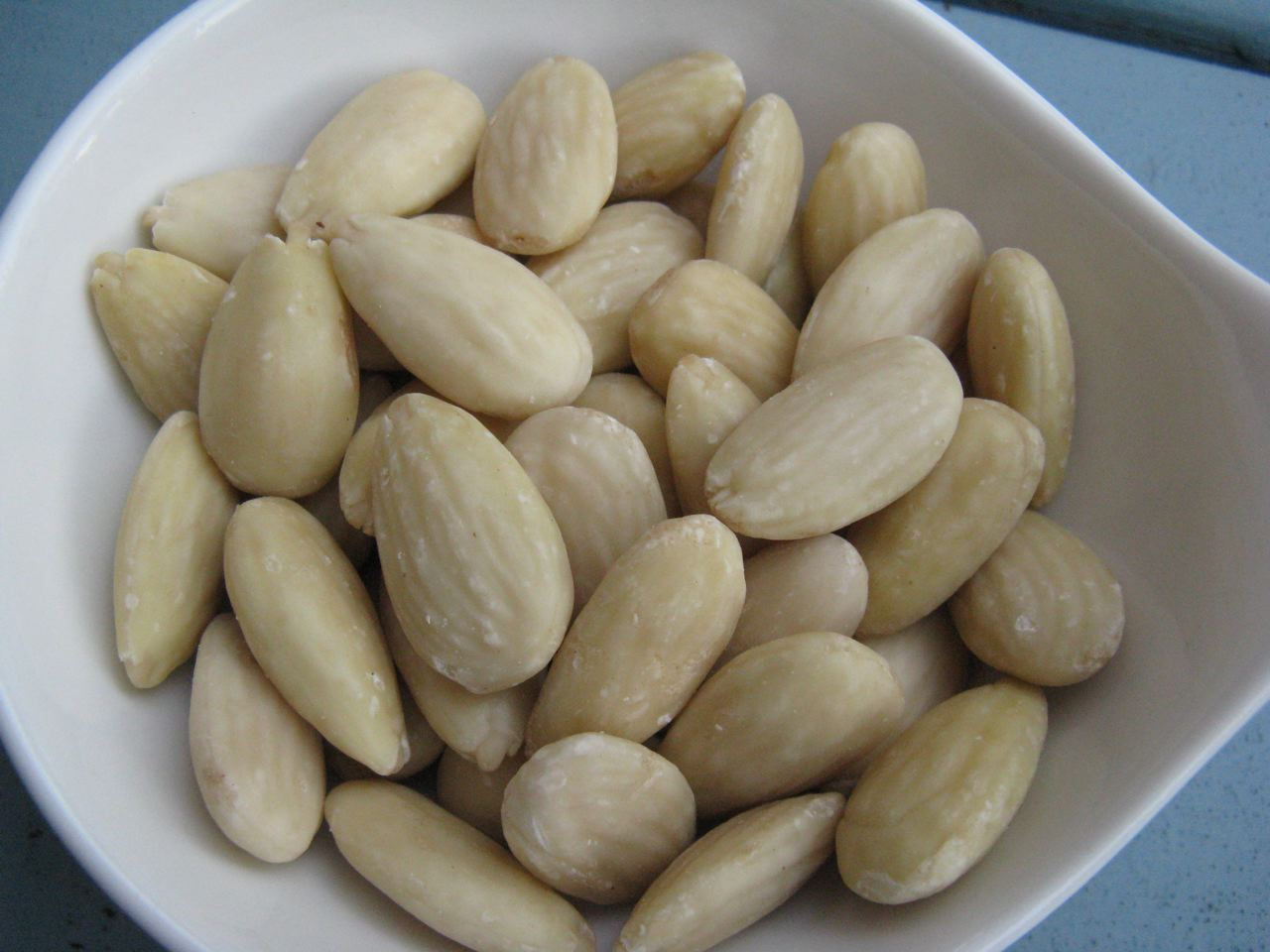
Blanched almonds

== Taxonomy ==
=== Scientific name ===
The almond was named Amygdalus communis by Carl Linnaeus in his Species plantarum in 1753. For the name 'Amygdalus' he referred to Gaspard Bauhin's Pinax (1623). In 1801 the species was for the first time placed in the genus Prunus by August Batsch. In that genus, the name Prunus communis was no longer available because in 1778 William Hudson had already assigned it to a taxon in which he included the plum (Prunus domestica). Batsch thereupon named the species Prunus amygdalus, where 'amygdalus' is the old generic name and should therefore be treated as a noun in apposition. Meanwhile, in 1768, Philip Miller had published the name of what he believed to be a second species of almond: Amygdalus dulcis. He mentioned Linnaeus' Amygdalus communis as the first species. It was not until 1967 that the combination Prunus dulcis was published for the almond by David Allardice Webb, on the assumption that Amygdalus dulcis was nothing more than a synonym of Amygdalus communis, and thus an available name for that species. The epithet dulcis (1768) is older than amygdalus (1801) and would therefore have priority. Webb noted that it was unfortunate that a species known for 165 years as Prunus amygdalus now had to be renamed under the rules of nomenclature. However, it later turned out that in 1967 the name Prunus dulcis was no longer available for the almond because it had already been used for a cherry in an 1878 publication by L'Abbé Rouchy. The oldest valid combination in Prunus is therefore Prunus amygdalus.

=== Sweet and bitter almonds ===
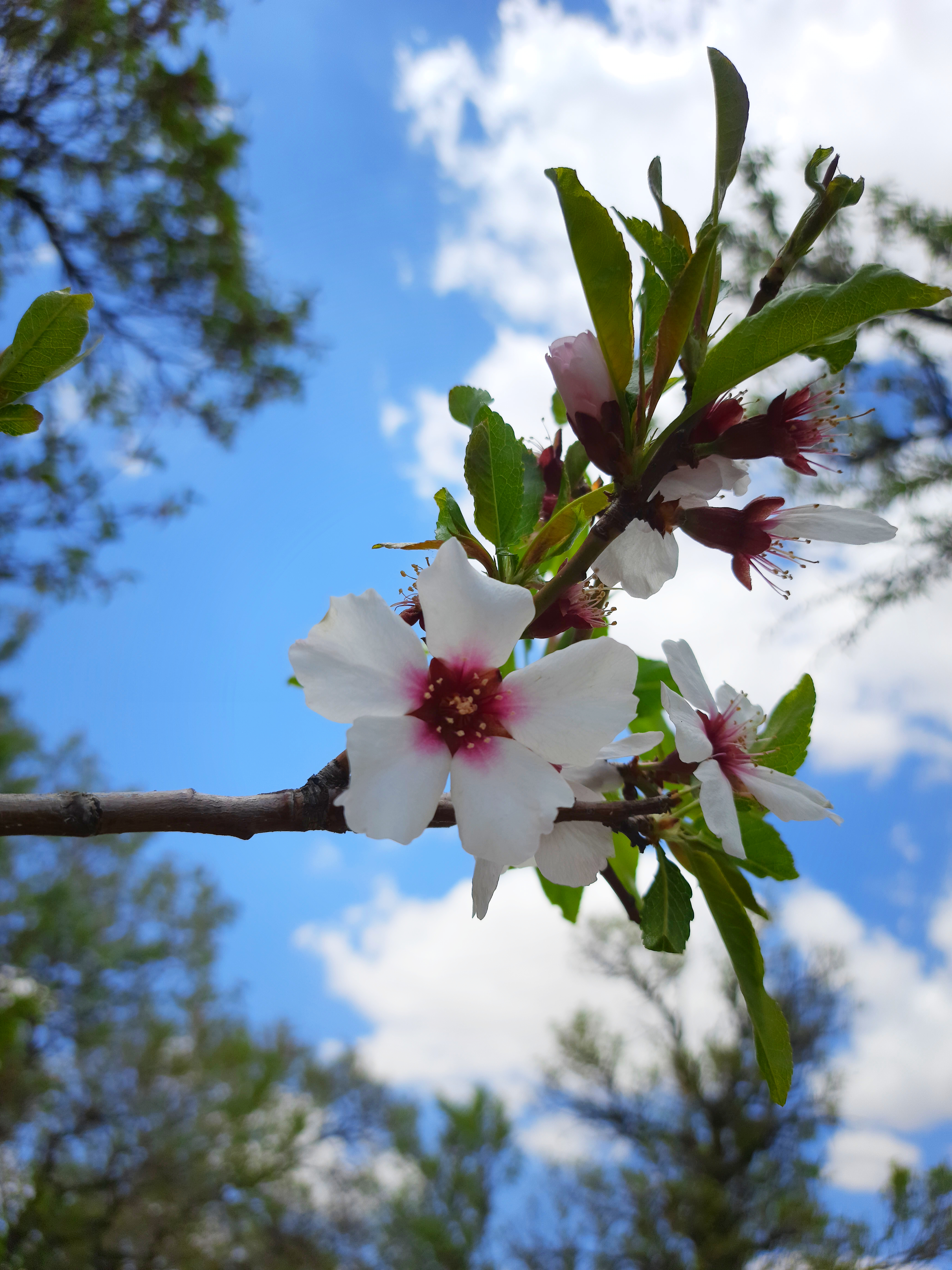
Almond blossom

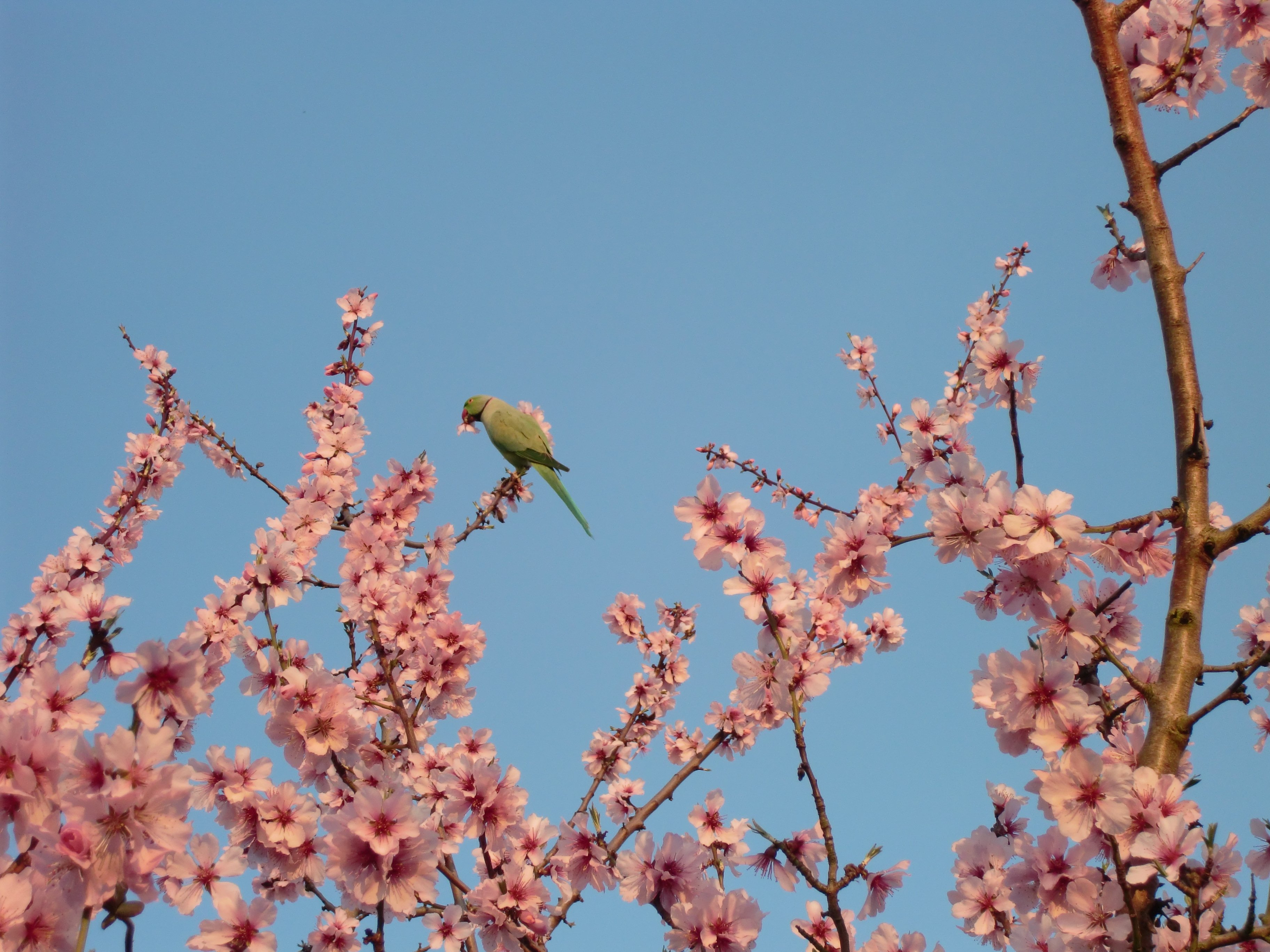
Blossoming of bitter almond tree

The seeds of Prunus amygdalus var. dulcis are predominantly sweet but some individual trees produce seeds that are somewhat more bitter. The genetic basis for bitterness involves a single gene, the bitter flavour furthermore being recessive, both aspects making this trait easier to domesticate. The fruits from Prunus amygdalus var. amara are always bitter, as are the kernels from other species of genus Prunus, such as apricot, peach and cherry (although to a lesser extent).

The bitter almond is slightly broader and shorter than the sweet almond and contains about 50% of the fixed oil that occurs in sweet almonds. It contains the enzyme emulsin which, in the presence of water, acts on the two soluble glucosides amygdalin and prunasin yielding glucose, cyanide and the essential oil of bitter almonds, which is nearly pure benzaldehyde, the chemical causing the bitter flavour. Bitter almonds may yield 4–9 milligrams of hydrogen cyanide per almond and contain 42 times higher amounts of cyanide than the trace levels found in sweet almonds. The origin of cyanide content in bitter almonds is via the enzymatic hydrolysis of amygdalin. P450 monooxygenases are involved in the amygdalin biosynthetic pathway. A point mutation in a bHLH transcription factor prevents transcription of the two cytochrome P450 genes, resulting in the sweet kernel trait.

=== Etymology ===
The word almond is a loanword from Old French almande or alemande, descended from Late Latin amandula, amindula, modified from Classical Latin amygdala, which is in turn borrowed from Ancient Greek amygdálē (ἀμυγδάλη) (cf. amygdala, an almond-shaped portion of the brain). Late Old English had amygdales 'almonds'.

The adjective amygdaloid (literally 'like an almond, almond-like') is used to describe objects which are roughly almond-shaped, particularly a shape which is part way between a triangle and an ellipse. For example, the amygdala of the brain uses a direct borrowing of the Greek term amygdalē.

== Origin and distribution ==
The precise origin of the almond is controversial due to estimates for its emergence across wide geographic regions. Sources indicate that its origins were in an area stretching across Central Asia, Iran, Turkmenistan, Tajikistan, Kurdistan, Afghanistan, and Iraq, or in an eastern Asian subregion between Mongolia and Uzbekistan. In other assessments, both botanical and archaeological evidence indicates that almonds originated and were first cultivated in West Asia, particularly in countries of the Levant. Most recent sources specified Iran and Anatolia (present day Turkey) as origin locations of the almond, with Iran as the main origin centre.

The wild form of domesticated almond grew in parts of the Levant. Almond cultivation was spread by humans centuries ago along the shores of the Mediterranean Sea into northern Africa and southern Europe, and more recently to other world regions, notably California.

Selection of the sweet type from the many bitter types in the wild marked the beginning of almond domestication. The wild ancestor of the almond used to breed the domesticated species is unknown. The species Prunus fenzliana may be the most likely wild ancestor of the almond, in part because it is native to Armenia and western Azerbaijan, where it was apparently domesticated. Wild almond species were grown by early farmers, "at first unintentionally in the garbage heaps, and later intentionally in their orchards".

== Cultivation ==
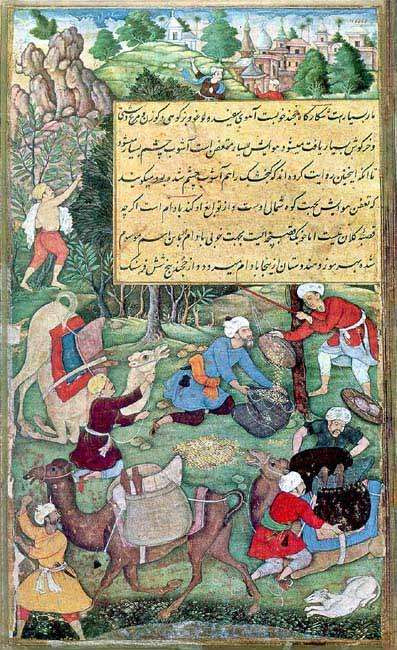
Mughal miniature depiction of the almond harvest at Qand-i Badam, Fergana Valley (16th century)

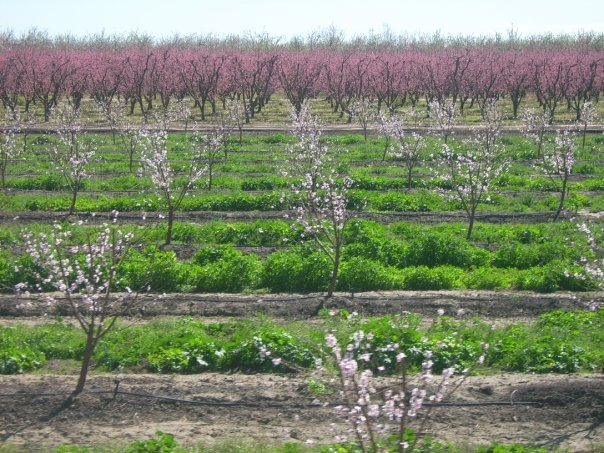
A grove of almond trees

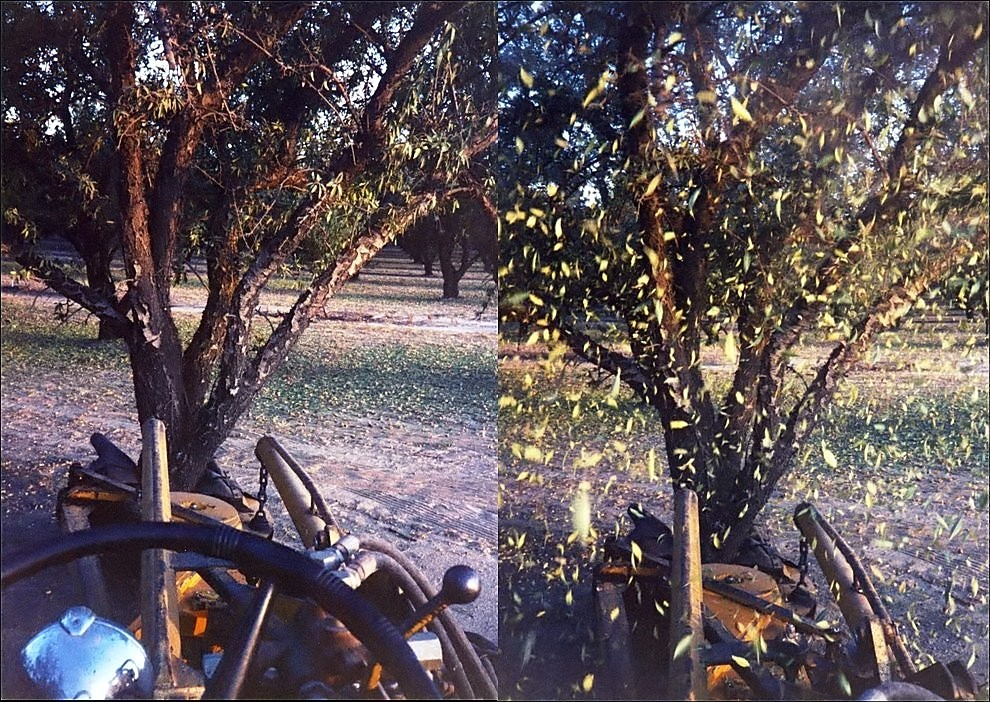
An almond shaker before and during a tree's harvest

Almonds were one of the earliest domesticated fruit trees owing to their ability to be grown from seed, allowing their cultivation to have perhaps predated the advent of grafting.

Domesticated almonds appear in the Early Bronze Age (3000–2000 BCE), such as the archaeological sites of Numeira (Jordan), or possibly earlier. They were found in Tutankhamun's tomb in Egypt (c. 1325 BCE), probably imported from the Levant.

Ibn al-'Awwam's 12th-century Book on Agriculture includes an article on almond tree cultivation in Spain.

Of the European countries that the Royal Botanic Garden Edinburgh reported as cultivating almonds, Germany is the northernmost, though the domesticated form can be found as far north as Iceland.

=== Varieties ===
Almond trees are small to medium-sized but commercial cultivars can be grafted onto a different root-stock to produce smaller trees. Varieties include:

- Nonpareil – originates in the 1800s. A large tree that produces large, smooth, thin-shelled almonds with 60–65% edible kernel per nut. Requires pollination from other almond varieties for good nut production.
- Tuono – originates in Italy. Has thicker, hairier shells with only 32% of edible kernel per nut. The thicker shell gives some protection from pests such as the navel orangeworm. Does not require pollination by other almond varieties.
- Mariana – used as a rootstock to result in smaller trees.

Breeding programs have found a high shell-seal trait, which reduces insect damage and mold contamination.

=== Pollination ===
The most widely planted varieties of almond are self-incompatible; hence these trees require pollen from a tree with different genetic characters to produce seeds. Almond orchards therefore must grow mixtures of almond varieties. In addition, the pollen is transferred from flower to flower by insects; therefore commercial growers must ensure there are enough insects to perform this task. The large scale of almond production in the U.S. creates a significant problem of providing enough pollinating insects. Additional pollinating insects are therefore brought to the trees. The pollination of California's almonds is the largest annual managed pollination event in the world, with over 1 million hives (nearly half of all beehives in the U.S.) being brought to the almond orchards each February.

Much of the supply of bees is managed by pollination brokers, who contract with migratory beekeepers from at least 49 states for the event. This business was heavily affected by colony collapse disorder at the turn of the 21st century, causing a nationwide shortage of honey bees and increasing the price of insect pollination. To partially protect almond growers from these costs, researchers at the Agricultural Research Service, part of the United States Department of Agriculture (USDA), developed self-pollinating almond trees that combine this character with quality characters such as a flavour and yield.

=== Diseases ===
Almond trees can be attacked by an array of damaging microbes, fungal pathogens, plant viruses, and bacteria.

=== Pests ===
Pavement ants (Tetramorium caespitum), southern fire ants (Solenopsis xyloni), and thief ants (Solenopsis molesta) are seed predators. Bryobia rubrioculus mites are most known for their damage to this crop.

=== Sustainability ===
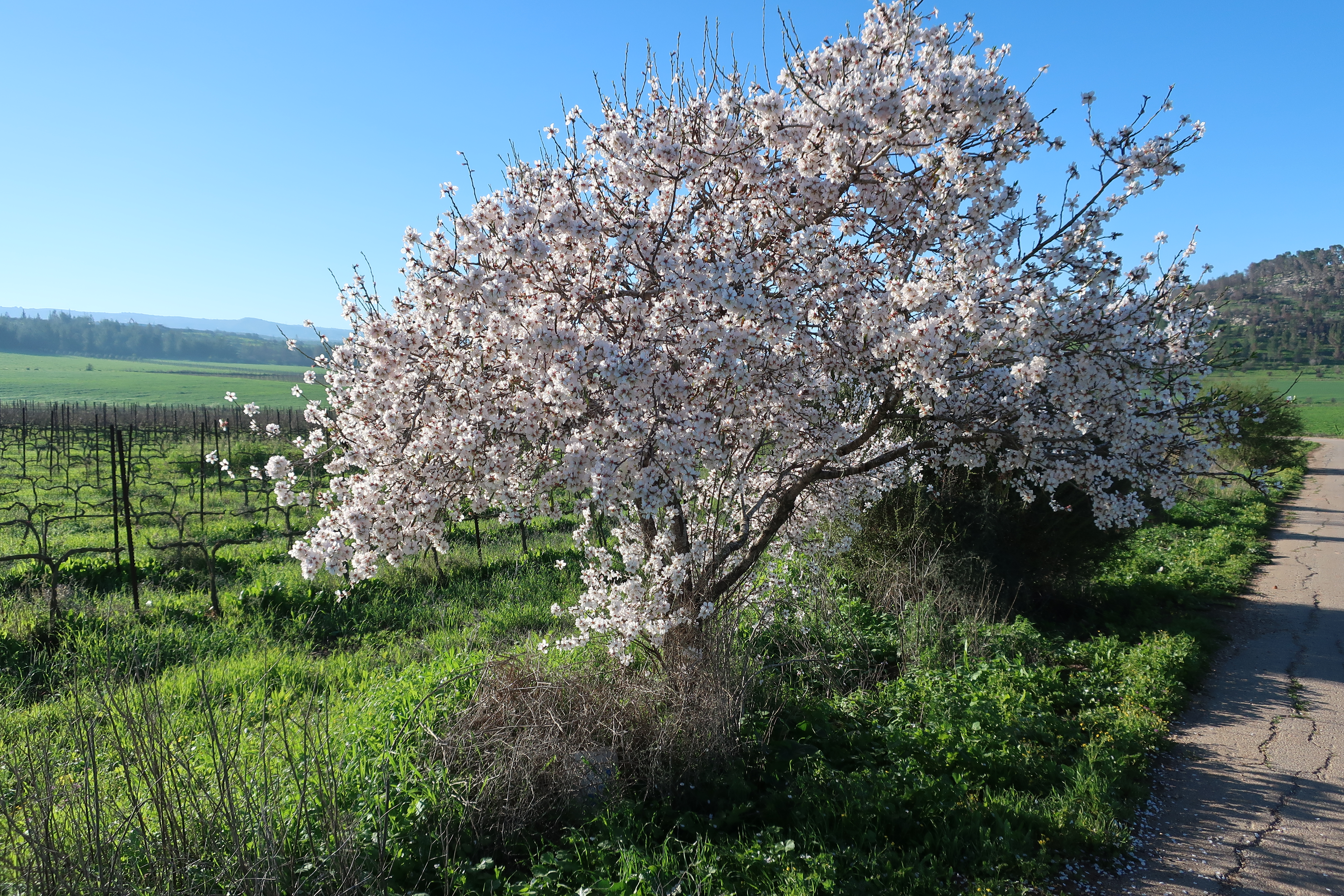
Almond tree with blossoming flowers, Valley of Elah, Israel

Almond production in California is concentrated mainly in the Central Valley, where the mild climate, rich soil, abundant sunshine and water supply make for ideal growing conditions. Due to the persistent droughts in California in the early 21st century, it became more difficult to raise almonds in a sustainable manner. The issue is complex because of the high amount of water needed to produce almonds: a single almond requires roughly 1.1 US gallons (0.92 imperial gallons; 4.2 litres) of water to grow properly. Regulations related to water supplies are changing so some growers have destroyed their current almond orchards to replace with either younger trees or a different crop such as pistachio that needs less water.

California almond farmers have promoted growing use of sustainable farming practices, including introduction of water-efficient irrigation technology, funding of honeybee health research, and productively using waste biomass (such as shells) in pursuit of a zero waste industry.

== Production ==
Almonds production 2024, tonnes
United States	2,000,340
Australia	370,000
Spain	369,700
Turkey	200,000
Morocco	163,616
World	3,951,576
Source: FAOSTAT, UN

In 2024, world production of almonds was 3.9 million tonnes, led by the United States with 51% of the total, followed by Australia and Spain as secondary producers (table).

Production of almonds

Almond yields

=== Australia ===
Australia is the largest almond production region in the Southern Hemisphere. Most of the country's almond orchards are located along the Murray River corridor in New South Wales, Victoria, or South Australia.

In the Australian financial year 1 July 2024–30 June 2025, the national almond crop fell 5%, but increased in value by 20%, to a record A$1.3 billion. Exports to China (61% of total exports) increased nearly 130%, from 33,373 t (32,846 long tons; 36,787 short tons) to 76,132 t (74,930 long tons; 83,921 short tons). India was the second-largest export market, at 19,803 t (19,490 long tons; 21,829 short tons), a tonnage similar to that of the previous financial year.

As of late February 2026, Australia was forecast to harvest a record almond crop of 167,000 t (164,000 long tons; 184,000 short tons) in the 2025–26 financial year.

=== Spain ===
Spain has diverse commercial cultivars of almonds grown in Catalonia, Valencia, Murcia, Andalusia, and Aragón regions, and the Balearic Islands. The almond cultivar 'Marcona' is unique, having a kernel that is short, round, relatively sweet, and delicate in texture; it is marketed by name. Its origin is unknown, but has been grown in Spain over centuries.

=== United States ===
In the U.S., production is concentrated in California where 400,000 ha (1,000,000 acres) and six different almond varieties were under cultivation in 2017, with a yield of 2.25 billion pounds (1.02 billion kilograms) of shelled almonds. California production is marked by a period of intense pollination during late winter by rented commercial bees transported by truck across the U.S. to almond groves, requiring more than half of the total U.S. commercial honeybee population. The value of total U.S. exports of shelled almonds in 2016 was $3.2 billion.

The largest almond growing counties in California are in the Central Valley, with just four counties - Fresno, Kern, Merced and Stanislaus - accounting for the majority of the State's almond production.

All commercially grown almonds sold as food in the U.S. are sweet cultivars. The U.S. Food and Drug Administration reported in 2010 that some fractions of imported sweet almonds were contaminated with bitter almonds, which contain cyanide.

== Toxicity ==
Bitter almonds contain some 40 times the trace levels of cyanide found in sweet almonds. Extract of bitter almond was once used medicinally, but even in small doses, its effects are severe or lethal, especially in children; the cyanide must be removed before consumption. The acute oral lethal dose of cyanide for adult humans is reported to be 0.5–3.5 mg/kg (0.2–1.6 mg/lb) of body weight (approximately 50 bitter almonds for the average adult), so that for children consuming 5–10 bitter almonds may be fatal. Symptoms of eating such almonds include vertigo and other typical cyanide poisoning effects.

Almonds may cause allergy or intolerance. Cross-reactivity is common with peach allergens (lipid transfer proteins) and tree nut allergens. Symptoms range from local signs and symptoms (e.g., oral allergy syndrome, contact urticaria) to systemic signs and symptoms including anaphylaxis (e.g., urticaria, angioedema, gastrointestinal and respiratory symptoms).

Almonds are susceptible to aflatoxin-producing moulds. Aflatoxins are potent carcinogenic chemicals produced by moulds such as Aspergillus flavus and Aspergillus parasiticus. The mould contamination may occur from soil, previously infested almonds, and almond pests such as navel-orange worm. High levels of mould growth typically appear as grey to black filament-like growth. It is unsafe to eat mould-infected tree nuts.

Some countries have strict limits on allowable levels of aflatoxin contamination of almonds and require adequate testing before the nuts can be marketed to their citizens. The European Union, for example, introduced a requirement since 2007 that all almond shipments to the EU be tested for aflatoxin. If aflatoxin does not meet the strict safety regulations, either the entire consignment must be reprocessed to eliminate the aflatoxin or it must be destroyed.

=== Mandatory pasteurization in California ===
After tracing cases of salmonellosis to almonds, the USDA approved a proposal by the Almond Board of California to pasteurize almonds sold to the public. After publishing the rule in March 2007, the almond pasteurization program became mandatory for California companies effective 1 September 2007. Raw, untreated California almonds have not been commercially available in the U.S. since then.

California almonds labelled "raw" must be steam-pasteurized or chemically treated with propylene oxide (PPO). This does not apply to imported almonds or almonds sold from the grower directly to the consumer in small quantities.

The Almond Board of California states: "PPO residue dissipates after treatment". The U.S. Environmental Protection Agency has reported: "Propylene oxide has been detected in fumigated food products; consumption of contaminated food is another possible route of exposure". PPO is classified as Group 2B ("possibly carcinogenic to humans").

The USDA-approved marketing order was challenged in court by organic farmers organized by the Cornucopia Institute, a Wisconsin-based farm policy research group which filed a lawsuit in September 2008. According to the institute, this almond marketing order has imposed significant financial burdens on small-scale and organic growers and damaged domestic almond markets. A federal judge dismissed the lawsuit in early 2009 on procedural grounds. In August 2010, a federal appeals court ruled that the farmers have a right to appeal the USDA regulation. In March 2013, the court vacated the suit on the basis that the objections should have been raised in 2007 when the regulation was first proposed.

== Uses ==
=== Nutrition ===
Almonds
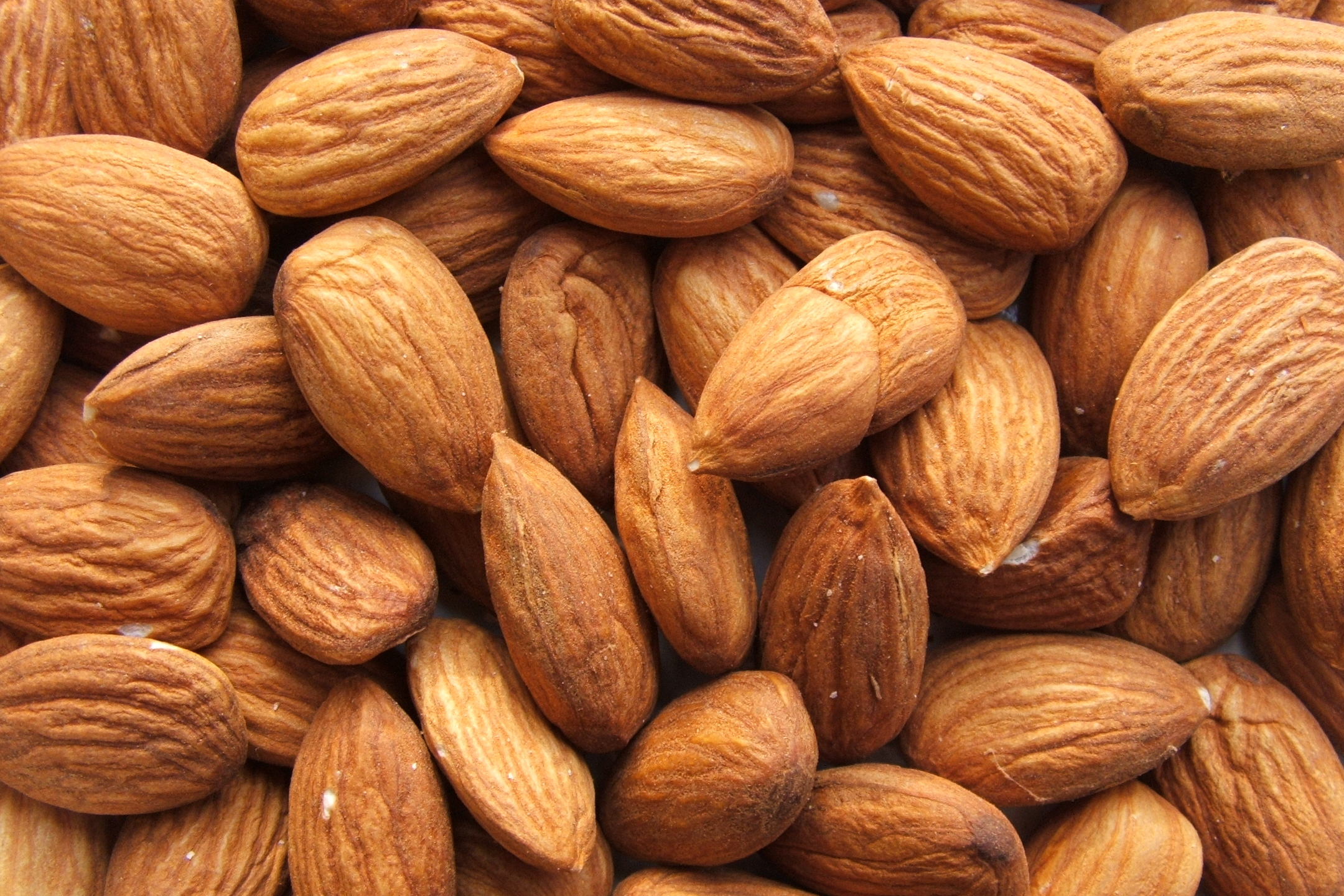

Nutritional value per 100 g (3.5 oz)
- Energy: 2,423 kJ (579 kcal)
- Carbohydrates: 21.6 g
- Starch: 0.7 g
- Sugars lactose: 4.4 g 0.00 g
- Dietary fiber: 12.5 g
- Fat: 49.9 g
- Saturated: 3.8 g
- Monounsaturated: 31.6 g
- Polyunsaturated: 12.3 g
- Protein: 21.2 g
Amino acids
Tryptophan	0.214 g
Threonine	0.598 g
Isoleucine	0.702 g
Leucine	1.488 g
Lysine	0.580 g
Methionine	0.151 g
Cystine	0.189 g
Phenylalanine	1.120 g
Tyrosine	0.452 g
Valine	0.817 g
Arginine	2.446 g
Histidine	0.557 g
Alanine	1.027 g
Aspartic acid	2.911 g
Glutamic acid	6.810 g
Glycine	1.469 g
Proline	1.032 g
Serine	0.948 g
Vitamins and minerals
Vitamins	Quantity %DV^{†}
Vitamin A equiv. beta-Carotene lutein zeaxanthin	0% 1 μg 1 μg
Vitamin A	1 IU
Thiamine (B1)	18% 0.211 mg
Riboflavin (B2)	78% 1.014 mg
Niacin (B3)	21% 3.385 mg
Pantothenic acid (B5)	9% 0.469 mg
Vitamin B6	8% 0.143 mg
Folate (B9)	13% 50 μg
Choline	9% 52.1 mg
Vitamin C	0% 0 mg
Vitamin D	0% 0 μg
Vitamin E	171% 25.6 mg
Vitamin K	0% 0.0 μg
Minerals	Quantity %DV^{†}
Calcium	20% 264 mg
Copper	110% 0.99 mg
Iron	21% 3.72 mg
Magnesium	64% 268 mg
Manganese	99% 2.285 mg
Phosphorus	39% 484 mg
Potassium	24% 705 mg
Selenium	5% 2.5 μg
Sodium	0% 1 mg
Zinc	28% 3.08 mg
- Other constituents: Quantity
- Water: 4.4 g
- Link to USDA Database entry
- ^{†}Percentages estimated using US recommendations for adults, except for potassium, which is estimated based on expert recommendation from the National Academies.

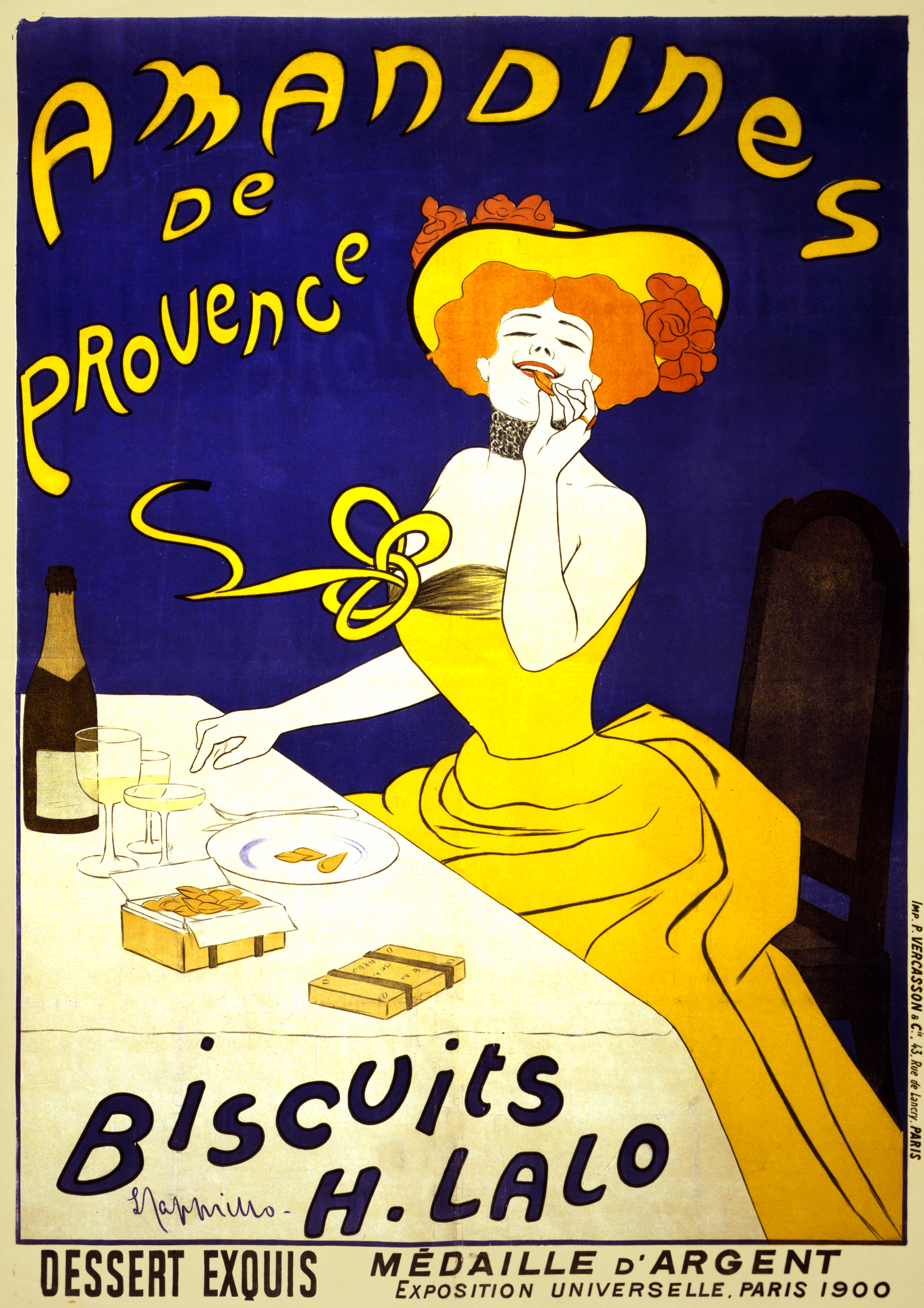
Amandines de Provence, poster by Leonetto Cappiello, 1900, which shows a woman eating almond biscuits (almond cookies)

Almonds are 4% water, 22% carbohydrates, 21% protein, and 50% fat (table). In a 100-gram (3 1/2-ounce) reference amount, almonds supply 2,420 kilojoules (579 kilocalories) of food energy, and are a rich source (20% or more of the Daily Value, DV) of vitamin E (171% DV), riboflavin (78% DV), and several dietary minerals, particularly copper (110% DV) and manganese (99% DV) (table). Per 100 g, almonds contain dietary fiber (12 g), the monounsaturated fat, oleic acid (31 g), and the polyunsaturated fat, linoleic acid (12 g; table source).

Typical of nuts and seeds, almonds are a source of phytosterols, such as beta-sitosterol.

=== Health ===
Almonds are included as a good source of protein among recommended healthy foods by the USDA. A 2016 review of clinical research indicated that regular consumption of almonds may reduce the risk of heart disease by lowering blood levels of LDL cholesterol.

=== Culinary ===
While the almond is often eaten on its own, raw or toasted, it is also a component of various dishes. Almonds are available in many forms, such as whole, slivered, and ground into flour. Almond pieces around 2–3 millimetres (1/16–1/8 in) in size, called "nibs", are used for special purposes such as decoration. A wide range of classic sweets feature almonds as a central ingredient. Marzipan was developed in the Middle Ages. Since the 19th century almonds have been used to make bread, almond butter, cakes and puddings, candied confections, almond cream-filled pastries, nougat, cookies (macaroons, biscotti and qurabiya), and cakes (financiers, Esterházy torte), and other sweets and desserts. In Saudi Arabia, almonds are a typical embellishment for the rice dish kabsa. Spanish cookery uses almonds in sweet dishes as well as in savory ones, ground up to thicken sauces and stews.

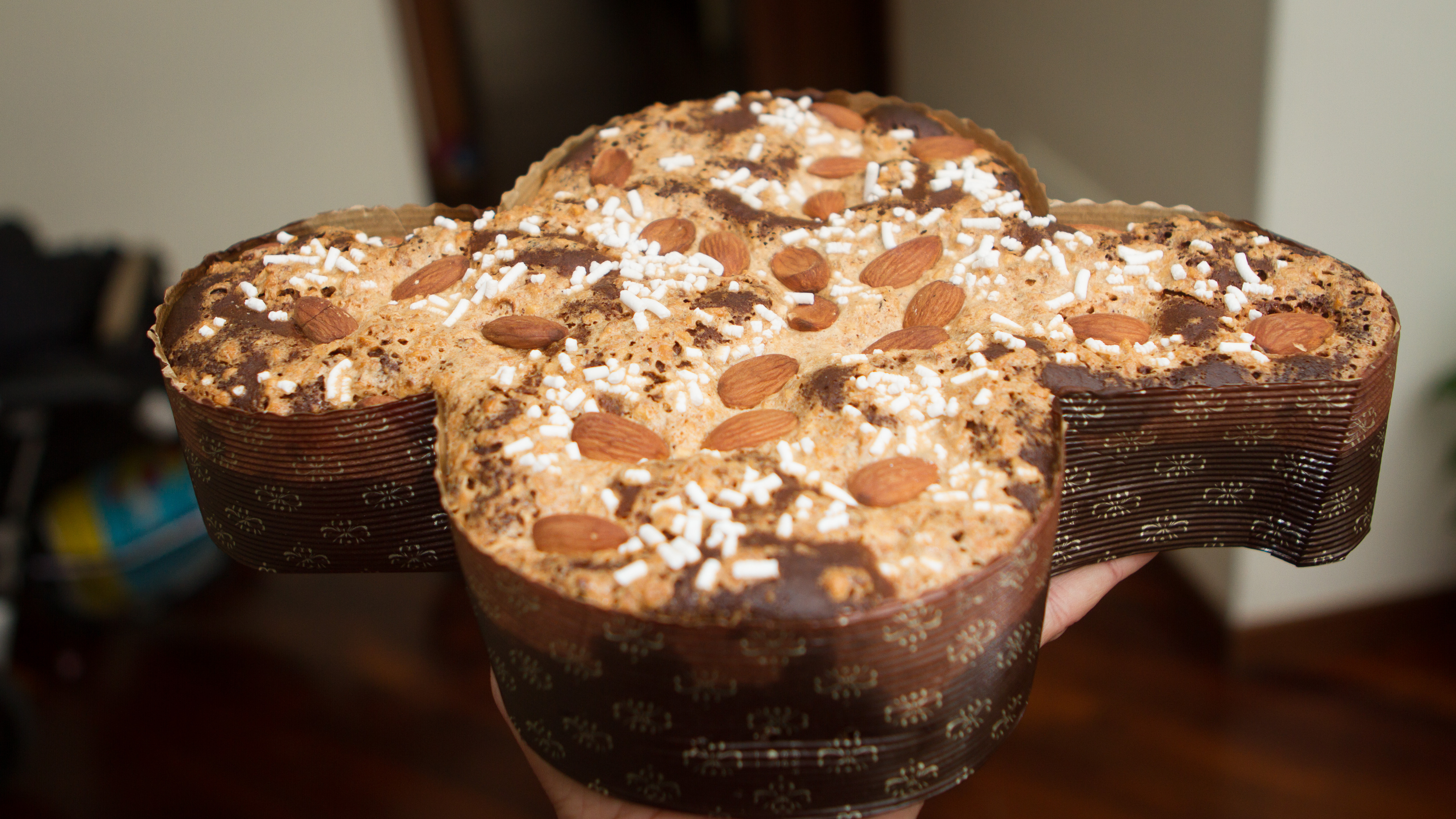
Italian Easter bread, the Colomba di Pasqua. It is the Easter counterpart of the two well-known Italian Christmas desserts, panettone and pandoro.

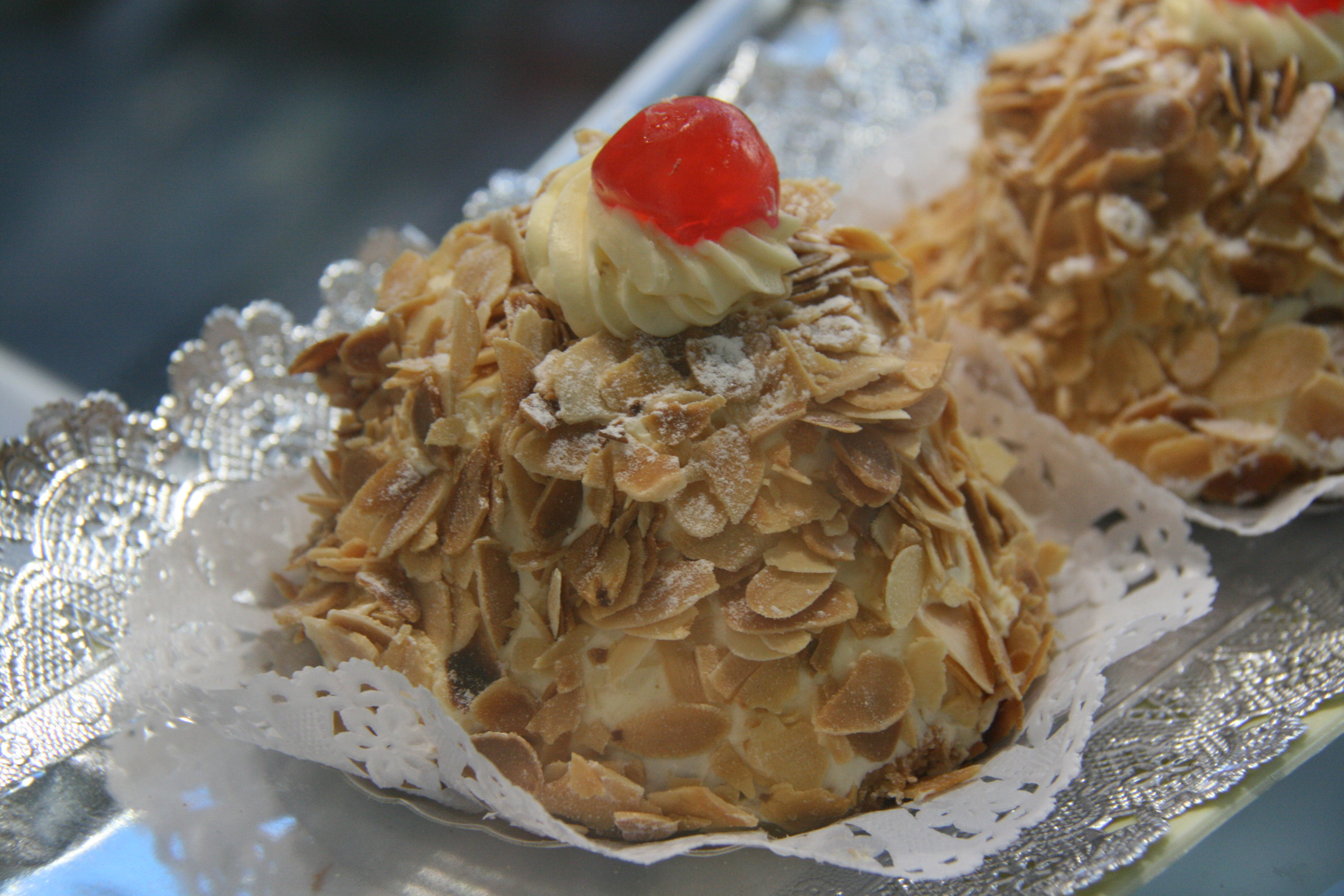
Almond cream cake covered in slivered almonds

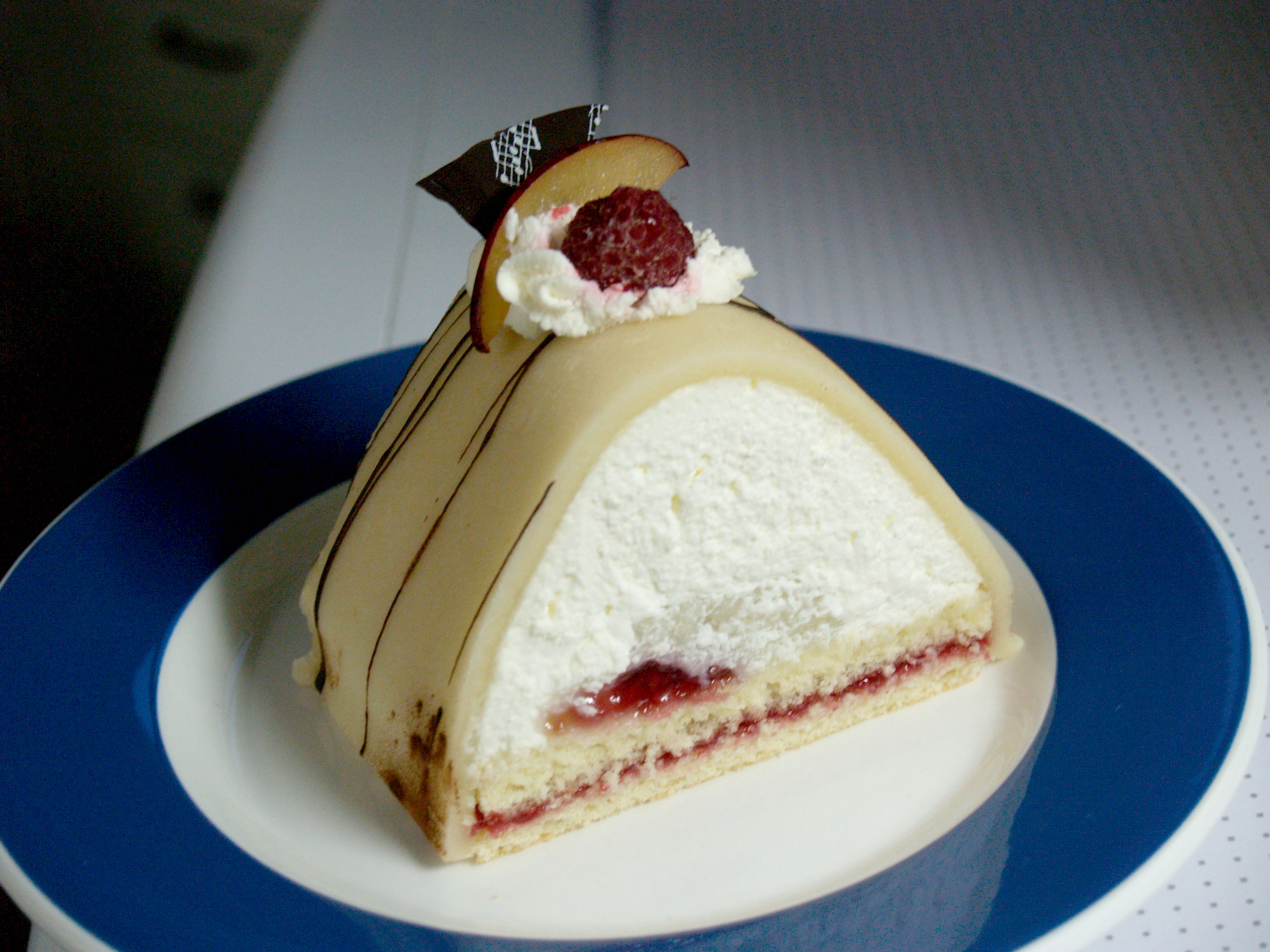
Danish cream cake covered with marzipan

==== Milk ====
Almonds can be processed into a milk substitute called almond milk; the nut's soft texture, mild flavour, and light colouring (when skinned) make for an efficient analog to dairy, and a soy-free choice for lactose intolerant people and vegans. Raw, blanched, and lightly toasted almonds work well for different production techniques, some of which are similar to that of soy milk and some of which use no heat, resulting in raw milk.

Almond milk, along with almond butter and almond oil, are versatile products used in both sweet and savoury dishes.

In Moroccan cuisine, sharbat billooz, a common beverage, is made by blending blanched almonds with milk, sugar and other flavourings.

==== Flour and skins ====
Almond flour or ground almond meal combined with sugar or honey as marzipan is often used as a gluten-free alternative to wheat flour in cooking and baking.

Almonds contain polyphenols in their skins consisting of flavonols, flavan-3-ols, hydroxybenzoic acids and flavanones analogous to those of certain fruits and vegetables. These phenolic compounds and almond skin prebiotic dietary fibre have commercial interest as food additives or dietary supplements.

==== Syrup ====
Historically, almond syrup was an emulsion of sweet and bitter almonds, usually made with barley syrup (orgeat syrup) or in a syrup of orange flower water and sugar, often flavoured with a synthetic aroma of almonds. Orgeat syrup is an important ingredient in the Mai Tai and many other Tiki drinks.

Due to the cyanide found in bitter almonds, modern syrups generally are produced only from sweet almonds. Such syrup products do not contain significant levels of hydrocyanic acid, so are generally considered safe for human consumption.

=== Oils ===
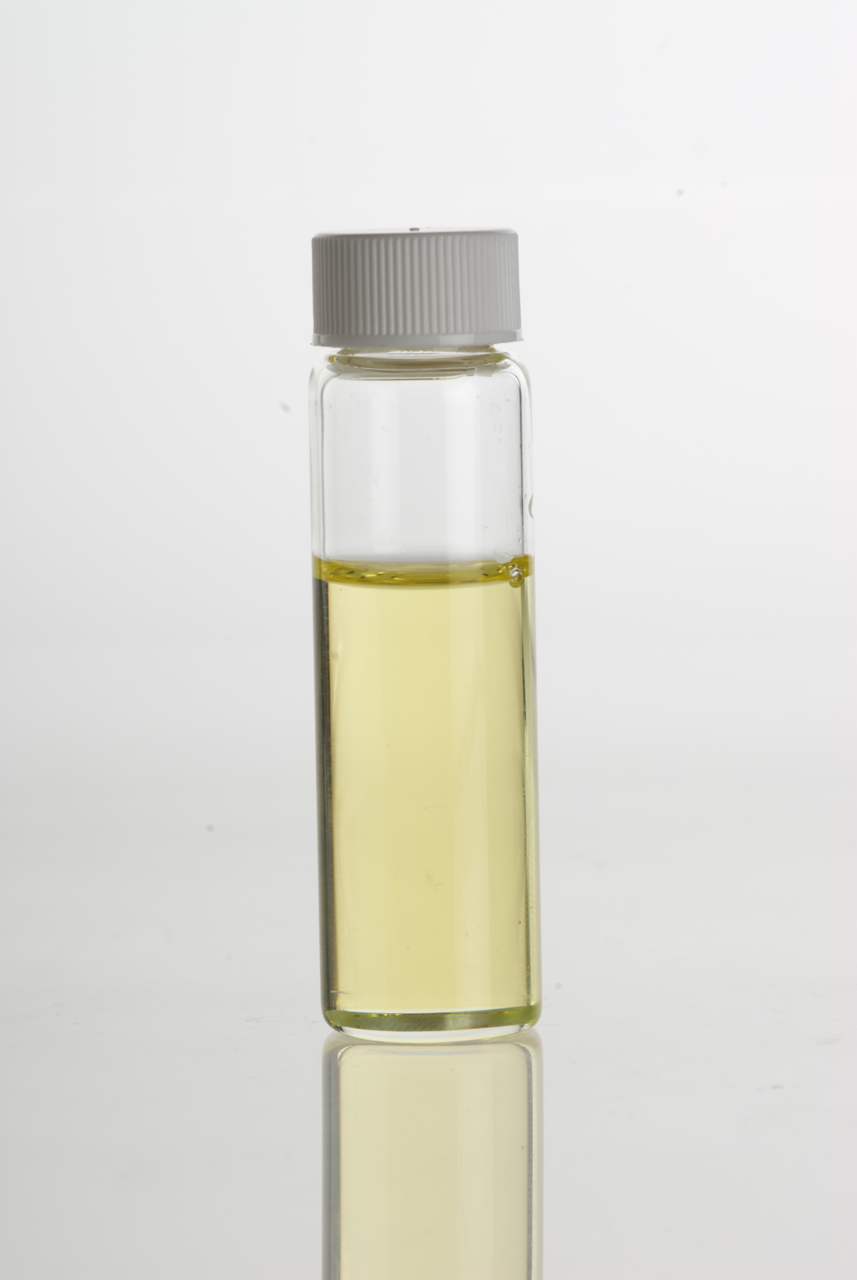
Almond oil

Oil, almond
Nutritional value per 100 g
- Energy: 3,699 kJ (884 kcal)
- Fat: 100 g
- Saturated: 8.2 g
- Monounsaturated: 69.9 g
- Polyunsaturated omega−3 omega−6: 17.4 g 0 17.4 g
Vitamins and minerals
Vitamins	Quantity %DV^{†}
Vitamin E	261% 39.2 mg
Vitamin K	6% 7.0 μg
Minerals	Quantity %DV^{†}
Iron	0% 0 mg
- Link to USDA Database entry
- ^{†}Percentages estimated using US recommendations for adults.

Almonds are a rich source of oil, with 50% of kernel dry mass as fat (whole almond nutrition table). In relation to total dry mass of the kernel, almond oil contains 32% monounsaturated oleic acid (an omega-9 fatty acid), 13% linoleic acid (a polyunsaturated omega-6 essential fatty acid), and 10% saturated fatty acid (mainly as palmitic acid). Linolenic acid, a polyunsaturated omega-3 fat, is not present (table).

When almond oil is analyzed separately and expressed per 100 grams as a reference mass, the oil provides 3,700 kJ (884 kcal) of food energy, 8 grams of saturated fat (81% of which is palmitic acid), 70 grams of oleic acid, and 17 grams of linoleic acid (oil table).

Oleum amygdalae, the fixed oil, is prepared from either sweet or bitter almonds, and is a glyceryl oleate with a slight odour and a nutty taste. It is almost insoluble in alcohol but readily soluble in chloroform or ether. Almond oil is obtained from the dried kernel of almonds. Sweet almond oil is used as a carrier oil in aromatherapy and cosmetics while bitter almond oil, containing benzaldehyde, is used as a food flavouring and in perfume.

== In culture ==
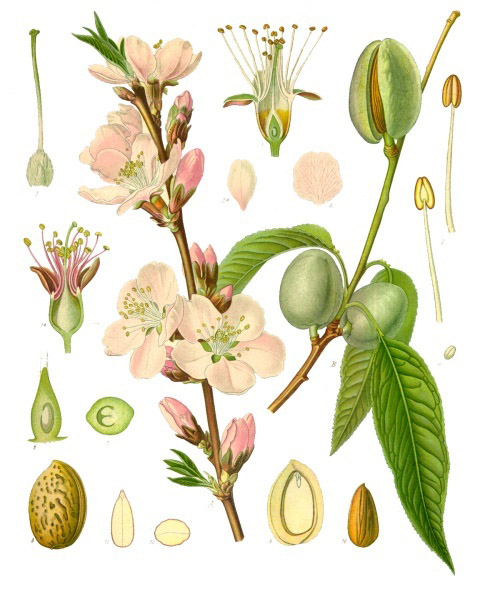
1897 illustration

The almond is highly revered in some cultures. In the Bible, the almond is mentioned ten times, beginning with Genesis 43:11, where it is described as "among the best of fruits". In Numbers 17, Levi is chosen from the other tribes of Israel by Aaron's rod, which brought forth almond flowers. The almond blossom supplied a model for the menorah which stood in the Holy Temple, "Three cups, shaped like almond blossoms, were on one branch, with a knob and a flower; and three cups, shaped like almond blossoms, were on the other … on the candlestick itself were four cups, shaped like almond blossoms, with its knobs and flowers" (Exodus 25:33–34; 37:19–20). In Jeremiah 1:11–12, the vision of an almond branch conveys a wordplay in Hebrew between shaqed (almond) and shoqed (watching), symbolizing God's vigilant commitment to fulfill His word. Many Sephardic Jews give five almonds to each guest before special occasions like weddings.

Similarly, Christian symbolism often uses almond branches as a symbol of the virgin birth of Jesus; paintings and icons often include almond-shaped haloes encircling the Christ Child and as a symbol of Mary. The word "luz", which appears in Genesis 30:37, sometimes translated as "hazel", may actually be derived from the Aramaic name for almond (Luz), and is translated as such in the New International Version and other versions of the Bible.

The Entrance of the flower (La entrada de la flor) is an event celebrated on 1 February in Torrent, Spain, in which the clavarios and members of the Confrerie of the Mother of God deliver a branch of the first-blooming almond-tree to the Virgin.

== See also ==
- Fruit tree forms
- Fruit tree propagation
- Fruit tree pruning
- List of almond dishes
- List of edible seeds
- Candied almonds
- Dragée – a candy.
