= California nut crimes =

Organised theft of nuts

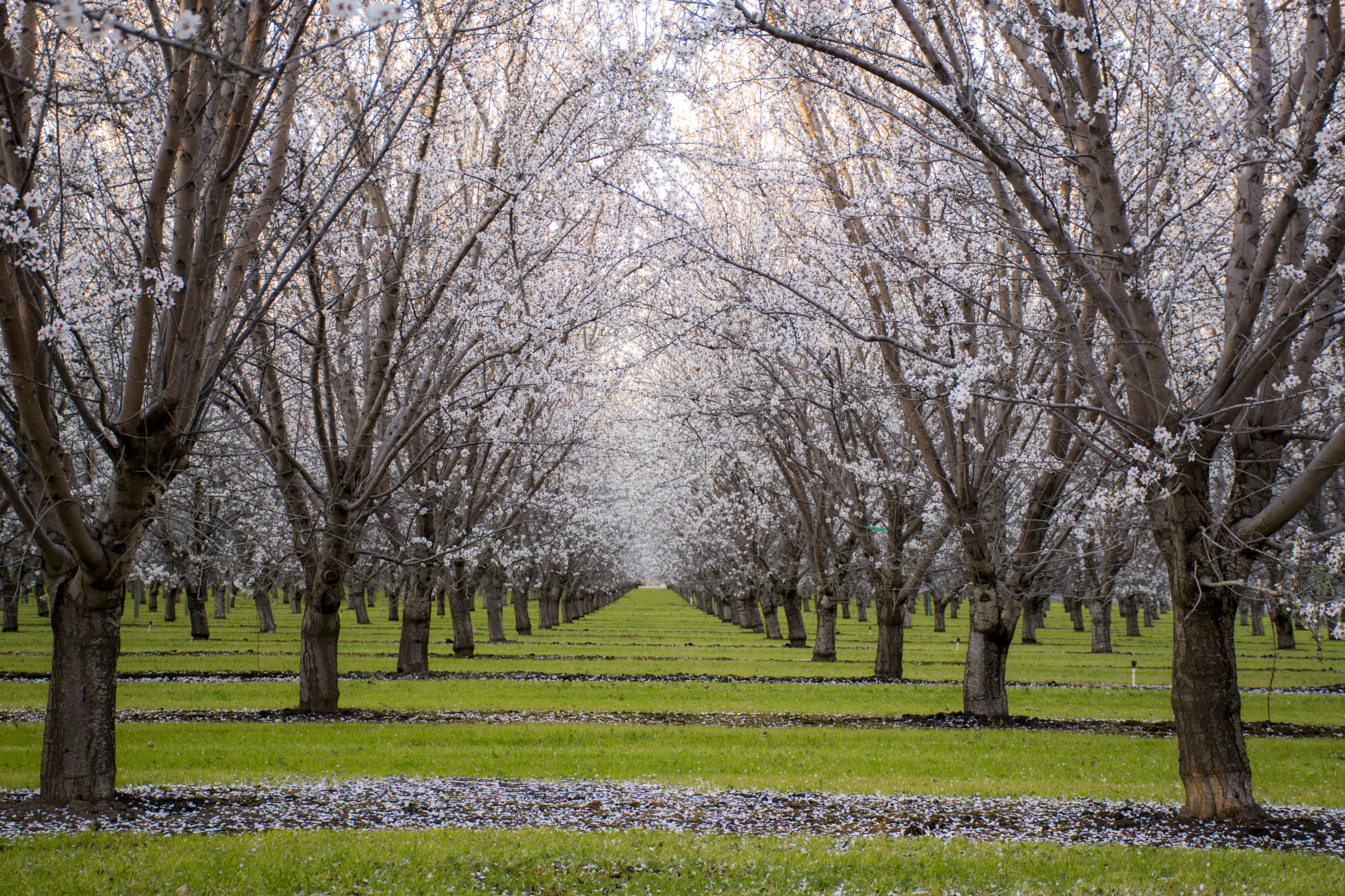
Almond trees in bloom in California

California nut crimes refers to the organized theft of nuts (almonds, pistachios, cashews, and pecans) in California. Reported cases of nut theft go as far back as 2006 with the worth of stolen nuts being millions of dollars. The thefts demonstrate a high level of sophistication, encompassing identity theft and a deep understanding of computer security and logistics.

== Background ==
Theft of food by organized criminal organizations has targeted a variety of food items in the past including oysters, bourbon, honey and Parmesan cheese. Theft of nuts is appealing to criminals because nuts have high market value all over the world, have a good shelf life and can't be traced using serial numbers or electronic means. Stealing nuts is non-violent and possession of nuts is also not in and of itself illegal. California produces 80% of the world's almonds and 99% of America's, and is the world's second largest producer of pistachios and walnuts. California's nut industry makes over $9 billion a year.

== Method ==
The majority of nut thefts were pickup frauds without any violence or damage to property. Methods used involve using fake trucks, scout trucks, fraudulent paperwork and getting information off the U.S. Department of Transportation website. Authentic trucking drivers would be hired for transporting the goods to warehouses, without actually knowing they were part of a theft. FBI agent Dan Bryant said the thefts and fraud were conducted by 'sophisticated people'. Other than the petty theft of nuts, large-scale nut crimes involve organized criminals who understand "the trucking business, identity theft, and computer security". The thefts have been reported from areas in California such as the San Joaquin valley. Authorities believe that some of the nuts are shipped abroad. A good grasp of the shipping business and procurement of false shipping papers can result in the stolen nuts being shipped to other parts of the world. A single case can involve the theft of nuts worth up to $500,000.

== Frequency ==
National Public Radio (NPR) reported cases of nut theft in California in 2006. In 2009, one incident of nut theft was reported to the US Department of Justice. Between 2013 and 2017 at least 35 truckloads of nuts worth about $10 million were reported stolen. From four incidents in 2012 worth about $500 thousand, nut crime rose to 31 reported incidents in 2015 valued at almost $4.5 million. This rose to over $10 million worth of nuts stolen from central California during the end of 2015 and beginning of 2016.

== Response ==
The nut industry has implemented various measures to combat thefts such as fingerprinting and photographing truckers, verifying vehicle information, and utilizing RFID tags. Law enforcement employs aerial and ground monitoring to track these incidents. A few drivers have been arrested but the thefts continue. A trucker was given a fake driver’s license as well as directions as to where to pick up the almonds and where to deliver them. When he was arrested it was found out that he only accepted the job because he needed the $180 offered. Law enforcement is aware that the masterminds behind these thefts are still at large, referring to them as the "bigger fish." Armenian Power, a criminal group in Los Angeles, has been implicated in the crimes. California almond theft has also been linked to Pakistani terror funding.

== In popular culture ==
Marc Fennell created an audiobook about the California nut crimes titled Nut Jobs: Cracking California's Strangest $10 Million Dollar Heist.

== Arrests and incidents ==
In 2006, authorities arrested Amrik Singh and Sukhwinder Grewal in connection to the theft of about $400,000 worth of almonds and walnuts. The stolen nuts were recovered from a Sacramento warehouse and were allegedly being shipped to markets in India, China, Canada, and parts of Europe and the United States.

In 2013, a driver who was using the alias "Alex Hernandez" fraudulently obtained a shipment of walnuts that were valued around $85,000 from Crain Walnut Shelling in Los Molinos, California. The suspect provided seemingly legitimate paperwork but failed to deliver the stolen goods to the destination in Canada.

In 2021, Alberto Montemayor was arrested for allegedly stealing 42,000 pounds of pistachios from the Touchstone Pistachio Company. The stolen nuts were valued over $170,000 and were found in a tractor trailer in a parking lot. Along with the truck, evidence was present that suggested the pistachios were being repackaged for resale.
