= Mechanical tree shaker =

Machine for shaking trees

Mechanical tree shaker being used to harvest olives from an olive tree.

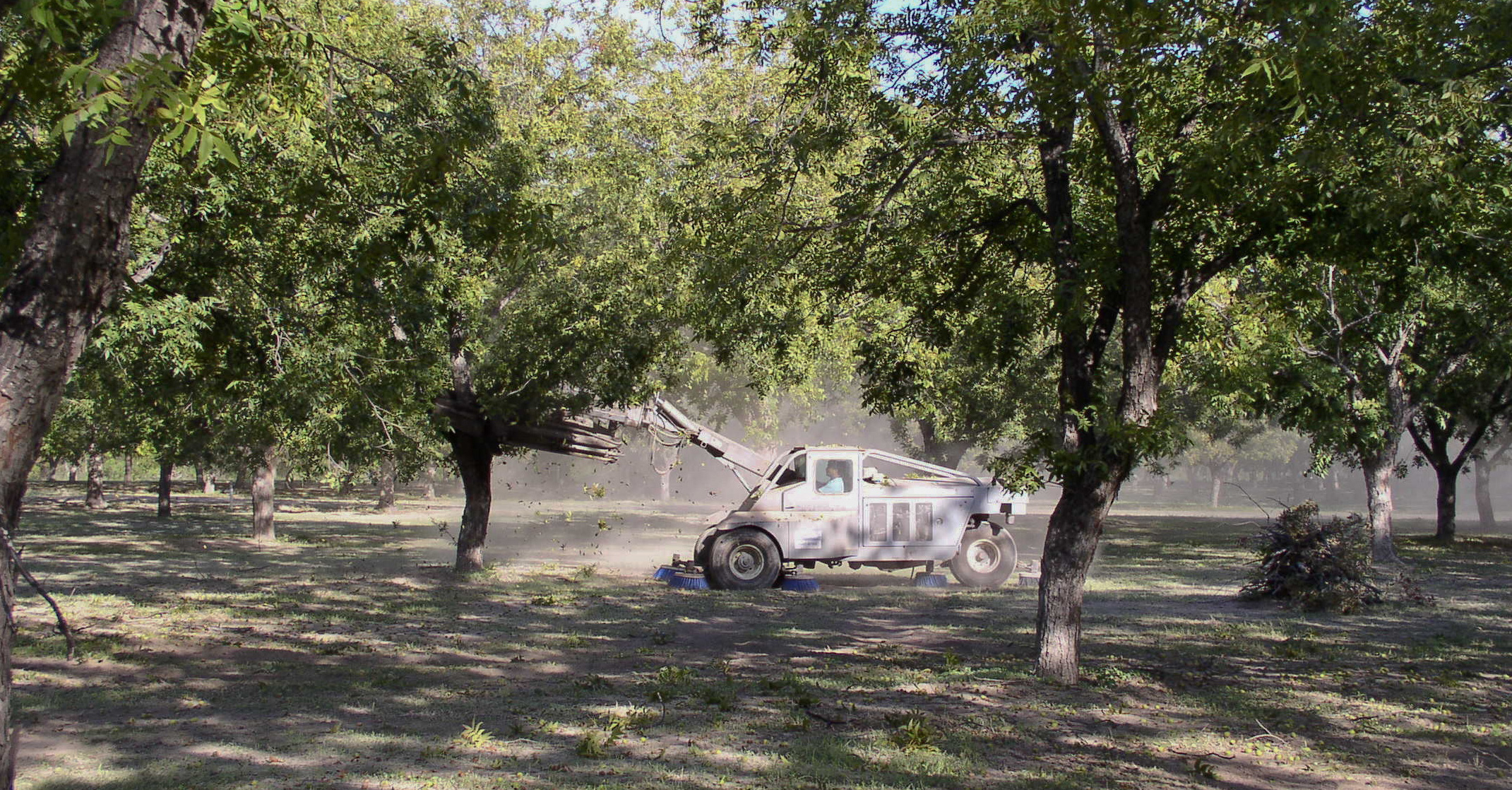
Harvesting of pecan nuts from Carya illinoinensis using a mechanical tree shaker.

A mechanical tree shaker is a device that uses a hydraulic cylinder to squeeze a tree. It is used in the harvesting of some fruit trees, especially pecans. Tree shakers are also used in the Christmas tree industry to remove dead needles from cut trees.
