= Taula del Sénia =

Coordinates: 40°36′43″N 0°19′36″E

- Free association of municipalities
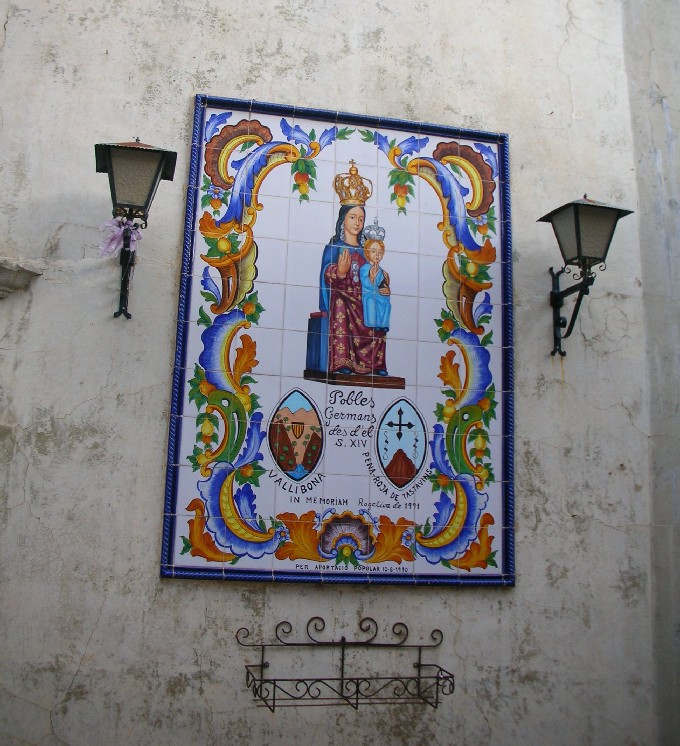
- Virgin Mary on the wall of the Vallibona main church honoring the traditional bonds between the towns of Vallibona (Valencian Community) and Pena-roja (Peñarroya de Tastavins) over the hills in Matarranya, Aragon.

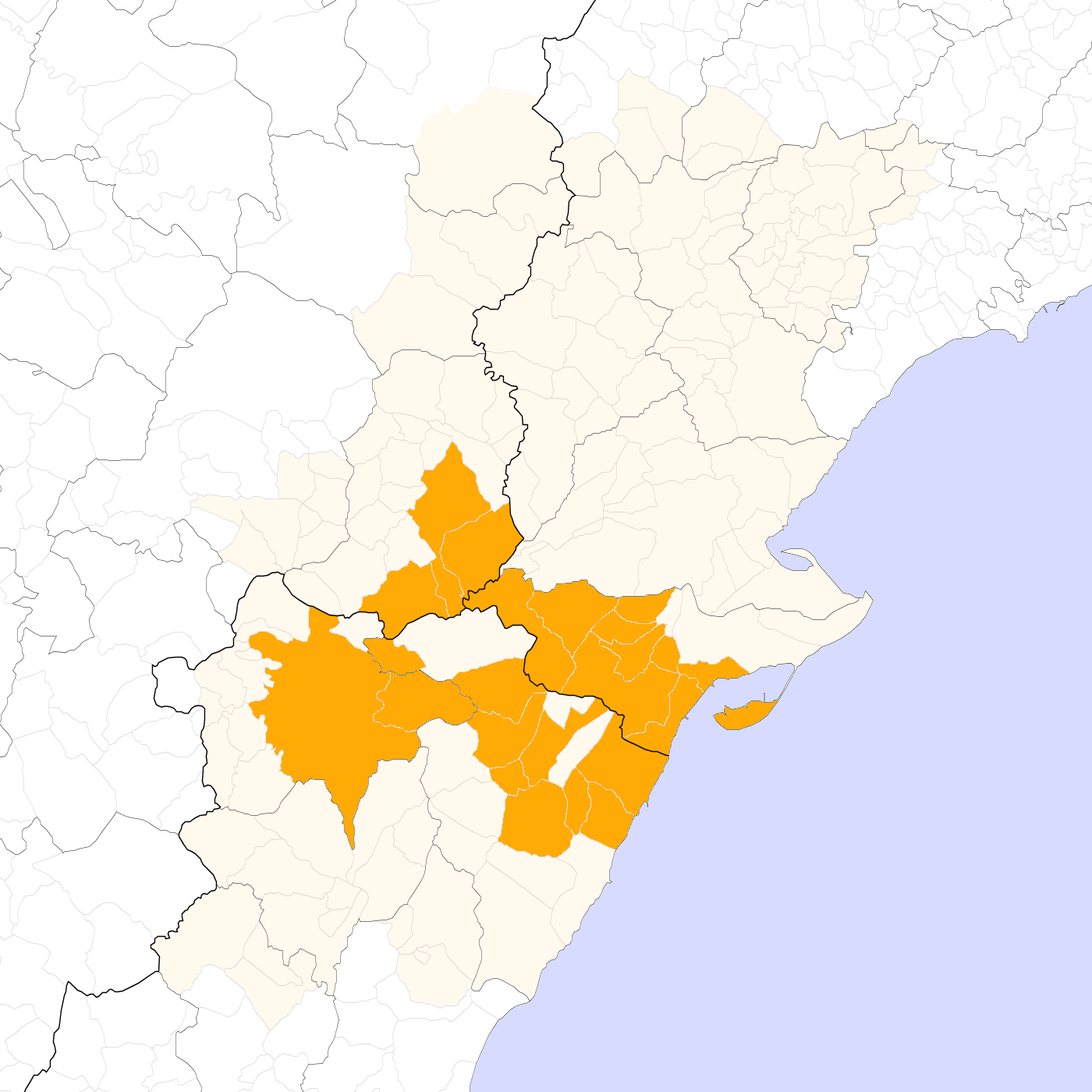
- Municipal areas that form the Taula del Sénia
- Country: Spain

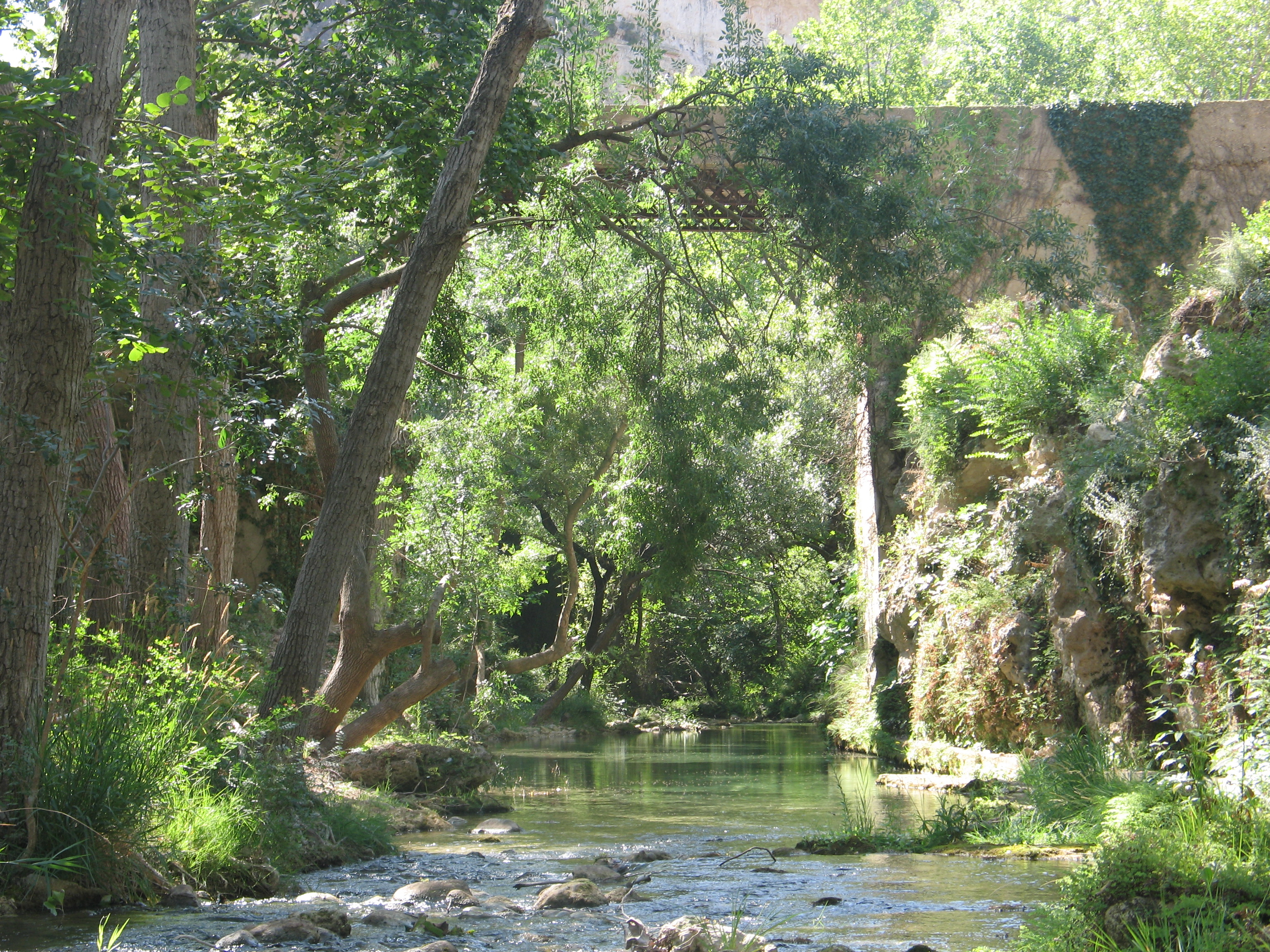
Upper course of the Sénia River in the Ports de Beseit.

The Taula del Sénia (Catalan pronunciation: [ˈtawla ðel ˈsenia]) or Mancomunitat de la Taula del Sénia is a commonwealth or free association of municipalities made up of 22 towns, totalling up to 100,000 people, of some of the comarcas that make up the center of the historical region of Ilercavonia (present day southern Aragon and Catalonia, and northern Valencia), Spain. The origin of the name lies in the fact that all municipal terms involved are located within 15 km of the Sénia River, perceived as the centre of the region in its upper course.

== Goals ==
The Taula del Sénia's main purpose is to alleviate the historical neglect of this greater comarca by managing its public municipal resources meaningfully. The organization of the municipalities in a mancomunidad may allow the region to achieve the necessary legal recognition for its administrative development. The main emphasis of the mancomunidad is the promotion of reindustrialization, as much industry fled the area during the last half of the 20th century and the current crisis has forced many key factories to close their doors. The Taula del Sénia focuses also on sustainable development by presenting the region as a meeting point of three Spanish Autonomous Communities, instead of the gathering of three fringe territories of Aragon, Catalonia and the Valencian Community. The reversal of the latter perception is crucial to the Taula del Sénia's efforts, for they blame their present status of disinvestment, unemployment and general economic neglect to being far away from the centres of power and decision of each of the three Autonomous Communities in question.

The Taula del Sénia has two related organizations, the Associació Territori del Sénia (Asociación Territorio del Senia) that focuses mainly on promoting the greater comarca as a tourist destination, as well as a cultural organization named Fundació Rei Jaume I (Fundación Rey Jaime I).

== Members ==
- Baix Maestrat (Valencia):
  - Benicarló
  - Càlig
  - Canet lo Roig
  - Cervera del Maestre
  - La Jana
  - Rossell
  - Traiguera
  - Vinaròs
- Matarranya (Aragon):
  - Beseit
  - Pena-roja
  - Vall-de-roures (Valderrobres)
- Montsià (Catalonia):
  - Alcanar
  - Freginals
  - Godall
  - La Galera
  - Mas de Barberans
  - Sant Carles de la Ràpita
  - Santa Bàrbara
  - La Sénia
  - Ulldecona
- Ports (Valencia):
  - Morella
  - Vallibona
