= Molacima =

Landmark of Beauty and Perspective in Catalonia's Serra del Montsia

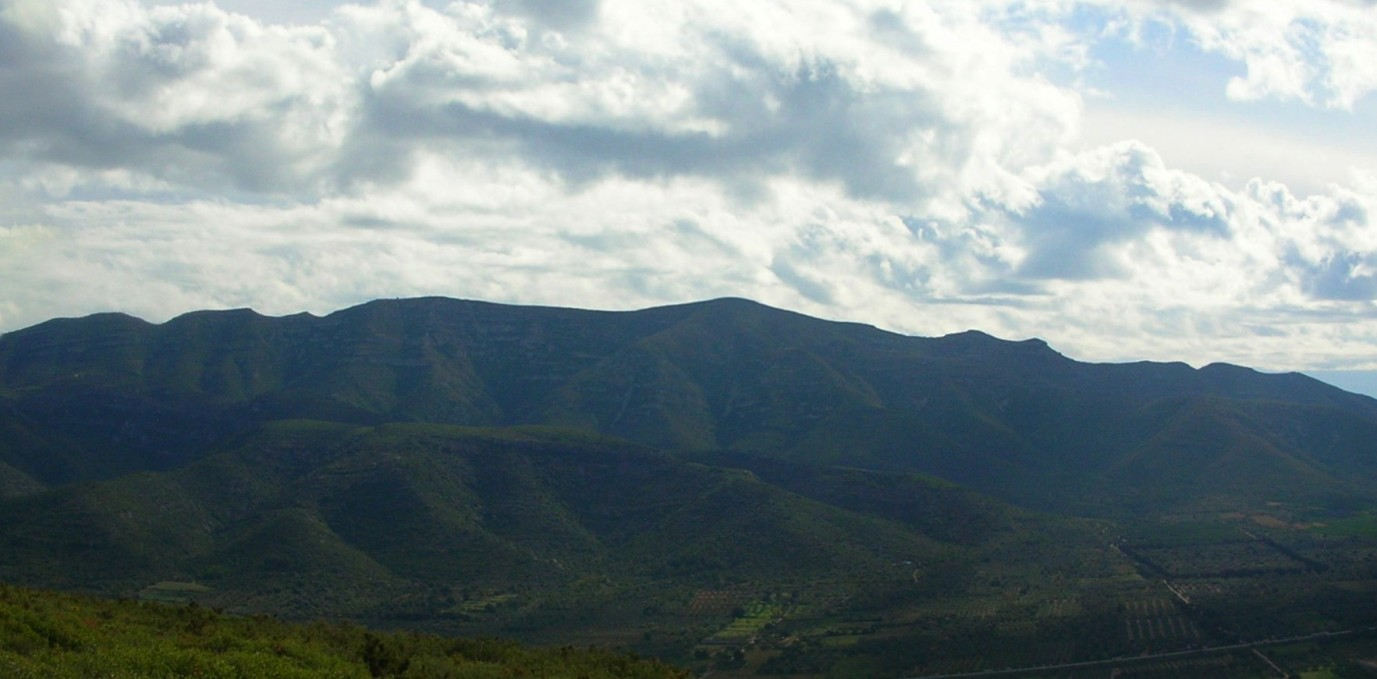
- Molacima is the summit in the middle

Highest point
- Elevation: 748 m (2,454 ft)
- Coordinates: 40°36′27″N 0°31′31″E

Geography
- Location within Catalonia
- Location: Montsià, Catalonia
- Parent range: Serra del Montsià

Geology
- Mountain type: Karstic

Climbing
- First ascent: Unknown
- Easiest route: From Ulldecona

The Molacima is a mountain of the Serra del Montsià range, Catalonia, Spain. It has an elevation of 748 metres above sea level. The Molacima, with its triangular profile, looks like the highest peak from many angles around Ulldecona, along the Autopista AP-7 between Barcelona and Valencia. The true highest summit of the range is, however, the less conspicuous La Torreta.

== See also ==
- Serra del Montsià
- Mountains of Catalonia
