= Merades =

Coordinates: 40°38′22″N 00°26′27″E

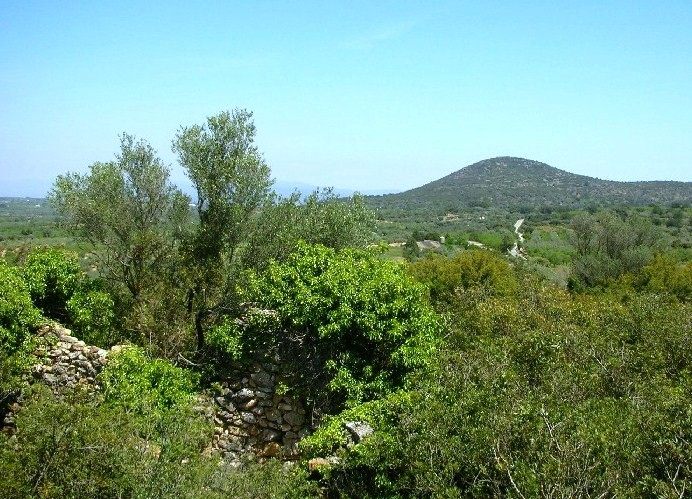
Merades, part of the northernmost section of the ruins. Coll de Vilallarga hill in the background

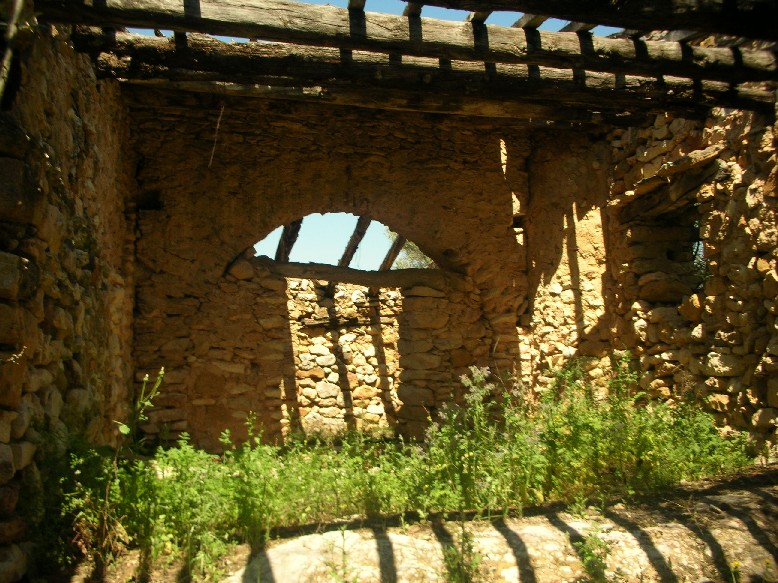
Inside one of the ruined buildings in Merades

Merades is an ancient abandoned village located in the Montsià comarca, Catalonia, Spain.

== History and description ==
The town is now uninhabited. Most of the houses in Merades are in an advanced state of ruin, especially towards its northern end, which is totally covered in bush and of difficult access.

The ruins of the village are located on a low hill, at a height of 187 m over sea level, in the western slopes of the Serra de Godall mountain range. In the 19th century Pascual Madoz referred to Merades as a "village that had been destroyed".

Administratively Merades belongs to the Godall municipality. It is very close to the TV-3313 road between Godall and Ulldecona.

The last inhabited building of the village was a masia, a traditional Catalan farmhouse, known as Mas de Merades, located at the southwest end of the ancient village.
