= Ilercavonia =

Coordinates: 40°42′N 0°30′E

Ilercavonia Ilercavònia
- Historical region
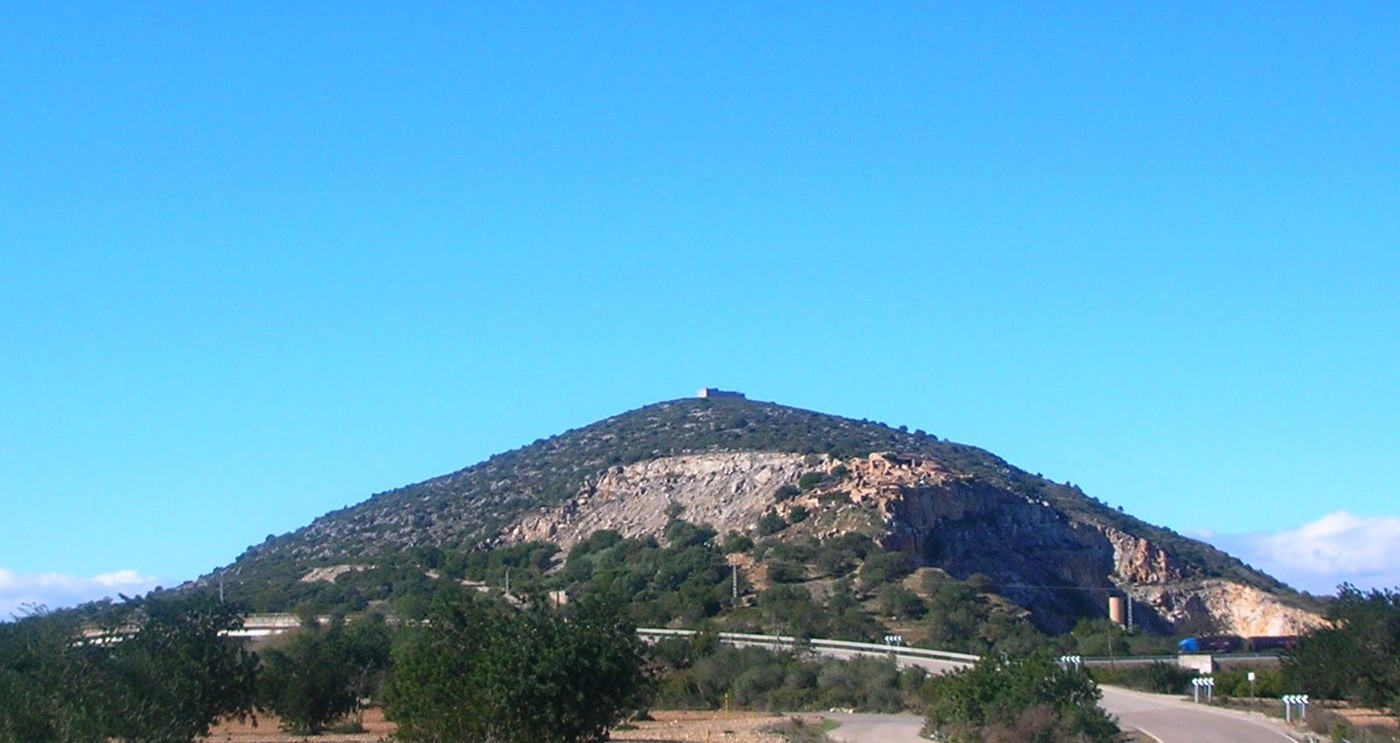
- Puig de la Nau mountain in Benicarló district. There are the ruins of an ancient Iberian settlement on the eastern side.

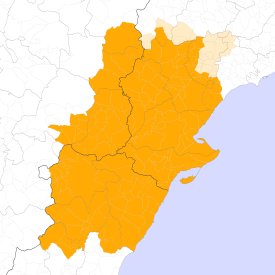
- Approximate extent of the Ilercavonia comarca.
- Country: Spain

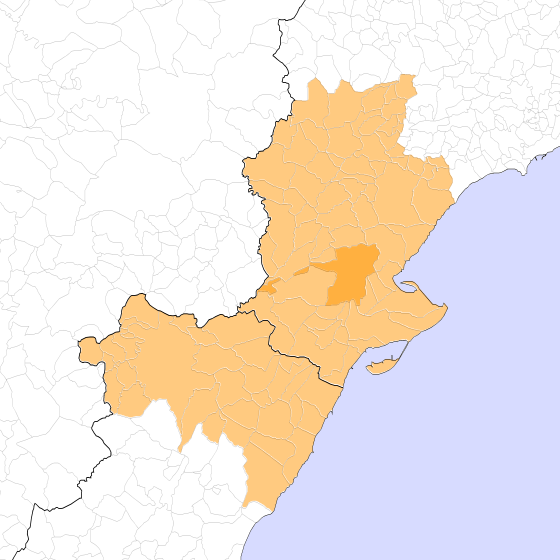
Present extent of the Diocese of Tortosa.

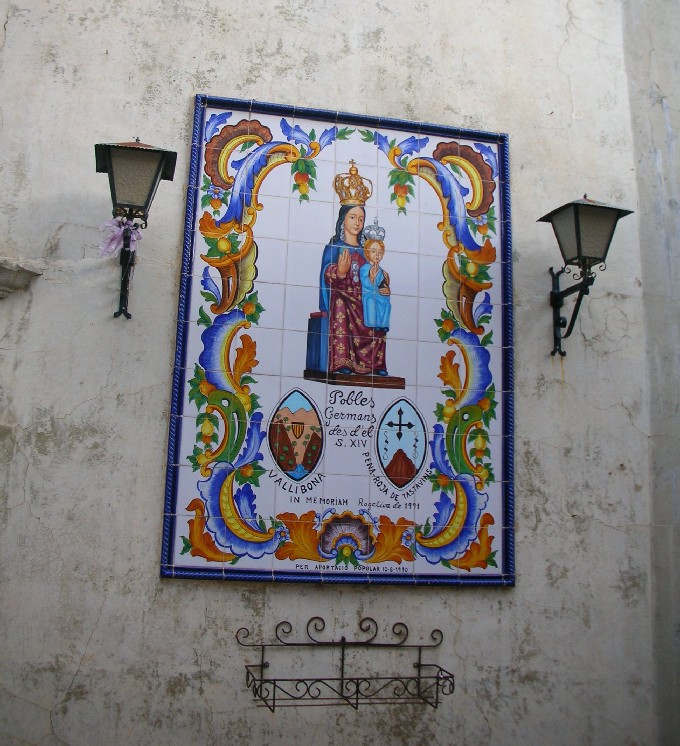
Virgin Mary on the wall of the Vallibona main church honoring the traditional bonds between the towns of Vallibona (Valencian Community) and Pena-roja (Peñarroya de Tastavins) over the hills in Matarranya, Aragon.

Ilercavonia (Catalan: Ilercavònia, Spanish: Ilercavonia) is an ancient comarca of Spain formerly populated by the ancient Iberian tribe known as Ilercavones. It is a greater comarca made up of smaller ones. The ties between the people of the region transcend ancient kingdom and later provincial borders.

== History ==
The name 'Ilercavonia' to refer to the territory occupied by the Ilercavones Iberian tribe appears in ancient Greek and Roman texts and documents. The northern limits of this territory were in Serra de la Llena, the northeastern in Coll de Balaguer, the western in Mequinensa and the southern in the area of a river mentioned as 'Oduba' in Roman documents, which could be either the Millars River, or another river further south along the coast closer to Sagunt. This geographical zone corresponds roughly to the present-day Maestrat/Maestrazgo, Matarraña/Matarranya and Terres de l'Ebre comarcas.

During the Middle Ages the territory of Ilercavonia found itself located at the confluence of the kingdoms of Valencia, Catalonia and Aragon. Since that time, and until the mid-20th century, the Diocese of Tortosa would give a certain basic recognition to the people of this ancient region who, despite having had no historic political representation of their own, share common geographic, economic, cultural and linguistic ties. The traditional Aragonese parishes of the Diocese of Tortosa, however, were segregated during General Franco's dictatorship, following the Concordat of 1953 between the Francoist regime and the Vatican.

Besides the lack of recognition and effective representation, this greater comarca has suffered much from a lack of development and investment since the mid-20th century, when the only railway line connecting the region with Aragon, the Renfe line from Tortosa to Alcañiz and Zaragoza, was terminated in 1973. This line was dismantled as a result of a 1962 World Bank report advising the Spanish State to concentrate investment in the great lines and to abandon the less profitable railways connecting rural areas. The bulk of the development in eastern and northeastern Spain was henceforward diverted to the cities of Barcelona and Valencia in detriment of this region.

Nowadays the name Ilercavonia is used mainly in academic and scientific circles, as well as in cultural events.

== See also ==
- Ilercavones
- Roman Catholic Diocese of Tortosa
- Maestrat
- Taula del Sénia
- Lower Aragon

== Bibliography ==
- María del Mar Llorens Forcada, María del Mar Llorens & Xavier Aquilué, Ilercavonia-Dertosa i les seves encunyacions monetàries, Institut d'Estudis Catalans. Societat Catalana d'Estudis Numismàtics, ISBN 84-7283-563-4
- Teofil Pitarch i Vives, Fraternitas Saecularis: Vallibona/Pena-roja de Tastavins, Diputació de Castelló. 2005, ISBN 978-84-96372-12-2
