= Los Alfaques disaster =

1978 tanker truck accident in Spain

Coordinates: 40°35′43″N 0°34′14″E

- Date: 11 July 1978
- Venue: N-340 national road and Los Alfaques campsite
- Location: Alcanar, Tarragona, Catalonia, Spain
- Type: Road tanker BLEVE
- Deaths: 215
- Injuries: 200+

The Los Alfaques disaster was caused by the explosion of a road tanker near a holiday campsite on 11 July 1978 in Alcanar, Spain. The exploding tanker, which was carrying 23 tons of highly flammable liquefied propylene, killed 215 people and severely burned 200 more, 178 of those killed were French. Several individuals from the company that owned the vehicle were prosecuted for criminal negligence. The disaster resulted in new legislation in Spain, restricting the transit of vehicles carrying dangerous cargo through populated areas to night time only.

Most of the victims were on holiday from France and some other European countries, and who were staying at the Los Alfaques seaside campground. The site, which is located at km 159 on the N-340 national road, is 2 kilometres (1.2 mi) south of the town of Sant Carles de la Ràpita.

== Background ==
The campsite of Los Alfaques (Spanish for "the sandbanks") (Note: It is now called "Els Alfacs", Catalan equivalent for "Los Alfaques".) is triangular-shaped and wedged between the beach and the N-340 coastal national road. It is about 2 km (1.2 mi) south of the nearest township, Sant Carles de la Ràpita, although it belongs to the territory of the Alcanar municipality. When the accident occurred, it was 200 m (656 ft) in length and 10,000 m^{2} (107,600 sq ft) in area. From north to south, it tapered from about 100 m (330 ft) down to 30 m (98 ft) wide. Separating the campsite from the road was a brick wall with a concrete foundation. The campsite's legal capacity was 260 people. However, on the day of the disaster, some 800 people were staying on the original grounds and on two new undeclared extensions; luckily, not all occupants were at the premises at the time.

The tanker involved in the explosion consisted of a Pegaso tractor unit and a Fruehauf tank trailer. It was owned by Cisternas Reunidas S.A. and on the day of the disaster was driven by 50-year-old Francisco Imbernón Villena. The trailer was manufactured in 1973. Its maximum capacity was 45 m^{3} (1,589 cu ft) with a maximum allowed mass of 19.35 metric tons (at 8 bar and 4 °C (39 °F)).

== Events ==
=== Loading and departure ===
At 10:15 am, the driver arrived at the state-owned ENPETROL refinery, located at La Pobla de Mafumet, 9 km (5.6 mi) north of Tarragona, to be loaded with liquefied propylene for another state-owned company, Paular (now Repsol) in Puertollano. At 12:05 pm the fully-laden tanker left the refinery carrying 23.47 metric tons (25.87 short tons) of propylene, which was more than 4 tons over the maximum design load for the tanker (i.e., 19.35 t (21.33 short tons)). Thus, the tank was nearly hydraulically full of liquid, with minimal ullage space.

The tanker drivers were expected to take the smaller N-340 national road instead of the A-7. In the late 1970s, the N-340 was still a narrow and winding coastal road that passed directly through several densely populated urban areas.

=== Explosion ===
By 2:35 pm the tanker was driving past the Los Alfaques campsite, after travelling 102 km (63 mi) from the ENPETROL refinery. The time is known because the driver's watch – which was found still attached to his burnt wrist – had stopped at 2:36 pm. The tightly packed campsite was crowded with nearly 1,000 visitors, many from West Germany, in caravans and tents.

During the journey, solar radiation and ambient temperature heated the liquefied gas. Under normal circumstances, the presence of ullage gas vapours would have meant an increase in pressure well within the mechanical limits of the tank. However, the tank was hydraulically full, which meant that the liquid had no room left to thermally expand. This resulted in the tank walls being stressed over their design capacity.

According to some reports from surviving witnesses, the tanker was already leaking liquefied gas while passing by the campsite. Some witnesses thought they heard a loud bang that preceded the leak. The bang might have been caused by a blown tire, which caused the tanker to swerve and crash into the wall separating the campsite from the roadside (possibly overturning in the process). Others argue that there was no mechanical failure or traffic accident before the loss of containment, with the overstressed pressure vessel failing at a weak point.

Within seconds, highly flammable propylene started flashing out of the ruptured tank and formed a white cloud that drifted into the campsite and towards a discothèque to the northeast. According to some reports, numerous intrigued campers approached the cloud with curiosity as it continued to spread. Eventually it became so dense that many were unable to see the tanker. Within moments of the cloud reaching the discothèque, it ignited into a flash fire that quickly returned to the source of the leak, thus causing the weakened tanker to explode. This generated a massive boiling-liquid expanding-vapour explosion (BLEVE), whereby the entire content of the tank car vaporized and burnt almost instantly in a fireball with a diameter estimated at between 40 and 60 m (130 and 200 ft) and 180 m (590 ft), resulting in tremendous levels of thermal radiation as well as a significant blast wave. Other reports suggest that external fires did not contribute to the onset of the BLEVE, with the pressure vessel having BLEVEd as a consequence of the tank walls being weakened by the thermal expansion of the liquid propylene, and the resulting expanding-vapour cloud catching fire only moments after its release.

The fire destroyed everything – cars, trailers and buildings – within a 90 m (300 ft) radius and charred everything within a 300 m (980 ft) radius, gutting over 90% of the main camping area. The 400 m^{2} (4,310 sq ft) discothèque to the northeast, which was later determined to be the likely source of the ignition, was also razed, killing all the staff members inside. Additionally, 34 vehicles and 21 tents were burnt out, a restaurant partially collapsed, and the tank trailer was broken into four main pieces (two sets of wheels and two sections of the pressure vessel). The blast effects of the BLEVE were comparatively minor. There was at least one secondary confined explosion inside the discothèque buildings. The tanker tractor was broken into four pieces. Two-thirds of the tank pressure vessel flew northwest, landed about 150 m (490 ft) away and then slid, coming to rest against the wall of a restaurant, 300 m (980 ft) from the starting point. The middle section was flung about 100 m (330 ft) into the campsite.

=== Emergency response ===
The explosion and fireball instantly killed 158 people, including the tanker driver. Victims were seen with their hair and clothing on fire, fleeing into the sea in an attempt to put out the flames. In the first 45 minutes after the disaster, the injured were removed in an uncoordinated fashion with the help of other survivors using their own cars and vans. Locals also provided help and took the injured to hospitals. Ambulances and other emergency forces gradually arrived. The first ambulance arrived at 2:45 pm from a Shell oil drilling site at San Carles. Municipal ambulances arrived at 3:05 pm and the fire brigade at about 3:30 pm. The Civil Guard and the armed forces searched the devastated camp for survivors. Three hours passed before the last of the injured were removed and taken to hospital.

The burning tanker blocked the road, dividing the injured into two groups, one being taken northwards and the other southwards. On the road to the north, the injured received adequate medical care once they had reached either the hospitals at Amposta or at Tortosa. At this stage, the final destination of 58 severely burned patients was the Francisco Franco Hospital in Barcelona. Eighty-two severely burned patients were taken south to the La Fe Hospital in Valencia. In most cases, no medical steps of any importance were taken during the journey. Several of the injured developed severe shock on the journey and had no measurable blood pressure on arrival. Many of the patients had burns covering more than 90% of their bodies, and most of them died during the following days. Contributing to the high mortality figure was the inappropriate medical care given en route to the hospital, especially for the injured that were driven south towards Valencia.

In the week following the disaster, the patients from France, West Germany, Belgium and the Netherlands were evacuated to their own countries.

=== Victims ===
The official figure for the number of victims is 215. More than 300 people were injured, some of them severely.

Many of the victims were burned beyond recognition. Identification was difficult, as most of them were wearing only swimming suits, and the administration building where guest records were stored was destroyed in the explosion. There was no DNA test available at that time. As a result of the work done by the forensic teams from the tourists' home countries, all victims eventually were identified.

Seven of the victims remained unidentified until some time later, and they were interred at the cemetery of Tortosa. The bodies of a French family, consisting of a couple and their two children, were returned to France some years later, after compensation had been settled. The bodies of another family of three originating from Colombia were never sent home, and they remain the only foreigners to be interred at the cemetery of Tortosa along with local victims.

== Inquiry ==
Following the disaster, Cisternas Reunidas accepted responsibility for the disaster but denied any order to the drivers to use the national road instead of the motorway, claiming that it was the driver who chose which road to take. Later, some workers at the Tarragona plant stated they heard the driver heatedly arguing with someone on the phone and demanding money for the motorway toll. ENPETROL initially declined any responsibility, claiming that the delivery of the cargo was the carrier's responsibility, and they had not received any complaint.

The official inquiry determined that the tanker had been severely overloaded and also lacked emergency pressure relief valves, which would have helped prevent the BLEVE. However, these valves, previously required, no longer were mandatory in 1978. The tanker was due for an inspection check-over in 1980, and it had passed the previous inspection.

The tank container was manufactured on 13 December 1973 by a workshop in Bilbao, and at that time it did not meet the requirements for carrying flammable liquids, since it lacked emergency pressure release valves. Therefore, the tank had been used to carry other substances, some of which were highly corrosive. Tests on the remnants of the steel tank revealed microscopic stress cracks consistent with corrosion caused by previous loads of improperly pressurized anhydrous ammonia. Possibly compounded by the effect of an external impact that caused additional structural damage, these factors likely led to the almost instantaneous rupture of the tank when the flames flashed back into the tanker. Even without safety valves, a structurally sound and properly filled tanker should have been able to maintain structural integrity in a fire long enough to at least allow nearby people to escape.

The inquiry also revealed that overloading of tankers was common practice at ENPETROL facilities. The Tarragona plant lacked either a meter to measure the amount of gas dispensed or an automatic shut-off device to prevent overfilling, and consequently most tanks were consistently overloaded. The driver was neither informed of the overloading, nor about the type and class of the cargo, and there was no means for him to check the pressure level of the tank before he departed or to monitor it in transit. He had not attended the hazardous materials (hazmat) training program for drivers of vehicles carrying dangerous goods, because the company considered his experience of 20 years as a lorry driver to be sufficient. The inquiry also determined that, between 3 January and 7 July 1978, 32 tanks driven by several different individuals left the Tarragona refinery overloaded.

== Legacy ==
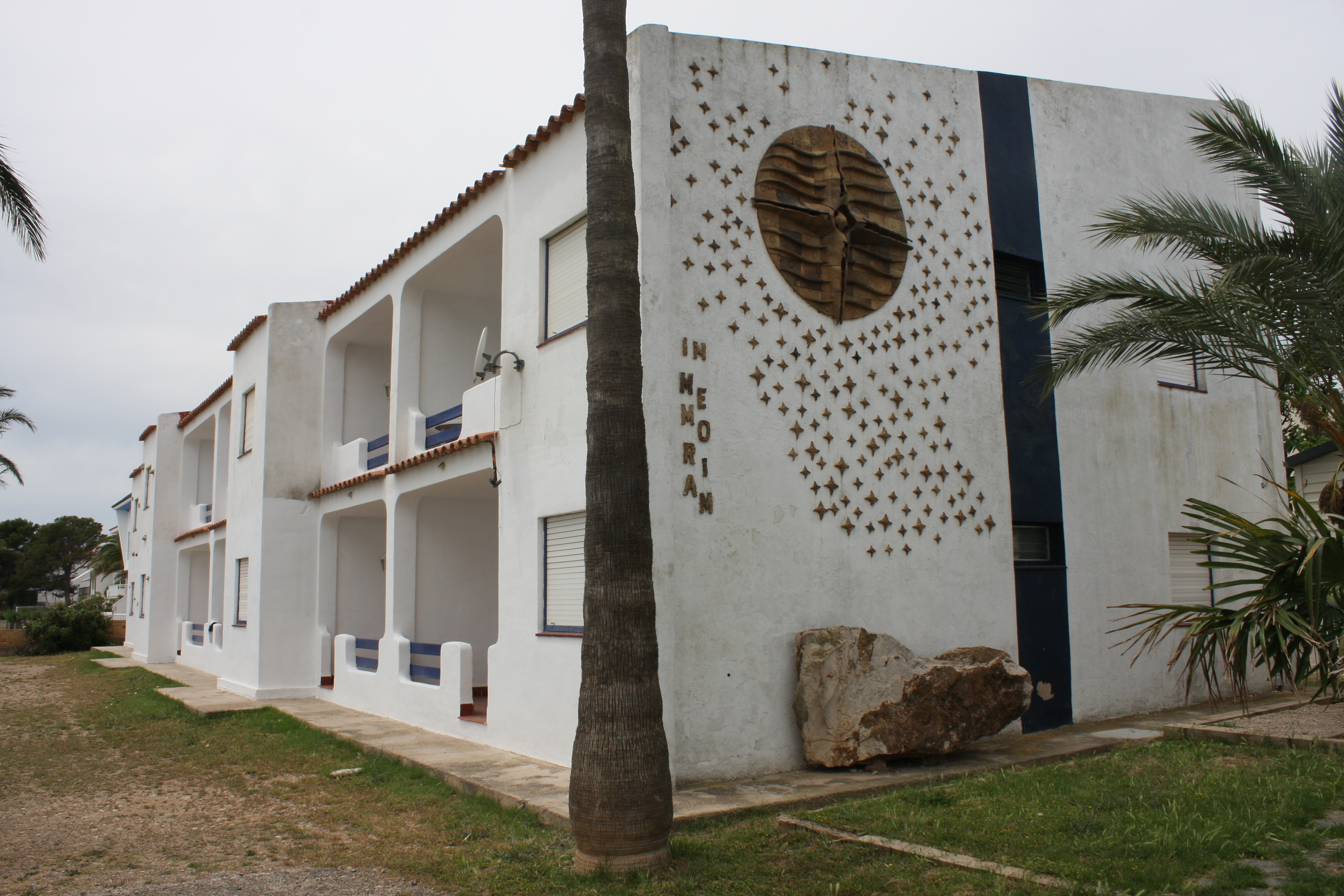
Memorial site on the side of a building at the campground

After the tragedy, daytime transit of populated areas by vehicles carrying dangerous cargo was prohibited.

In 1982, four employees of ENPETROL and two of Cisternas Reunidas were convicted of criminal negligence and were sentenced to prison for between one and four years. Later, four of them were released after appealing the court's decision, and all prison sentences were suspended or reduced. The two companies paid an equivalent of €13.23 million (not allowing for inflation) as compensation to the victims.

Six months after the tragedy, the completely renovated campsite was reopened to tourists and Los Alfaques continued in operation.

In 2012 the owners of the still-operating campsite sought relief through Spanish courts under the newly approved "right to be forgotten" act passed by Spain, arguing that Google Search results were unfairly weighted towards the 1978 disaster and were driving away their business. The campsite owners protested that even 30 years after the disaster, the top 12 Google search results for "Los Alfaques" still focused on the 1978 tragedy, including many gruesome thumbnails of burnt human remains, stacked caskets, and coroner procedures during cleanup of the campground. The trial was dismissed, with the plaintiffs being informed that they would need to pursue a lawsuit against Google in the United States.

== In popular culture ==
The accident is featured in the 2007 German film Day of Disaster (original title: Tarragona – Ein Paradies in Flammen, also known as Tarragona: Paradise on Fire), directed by Peter Keglevic. The film is loosely based on real facts, and contains blunders and factual errors, such as cars or registration plates which could have appeared only years later, or the driver spending the night before at home with the already (over)loaded tanker parked in front of his house.

== See also ==
- List of BLEVEs
- List of road tanker fires and explosions
- List of transportation fires
