= Santa Bàrbara, Spain =

Santa Bàrbara
- Municipality
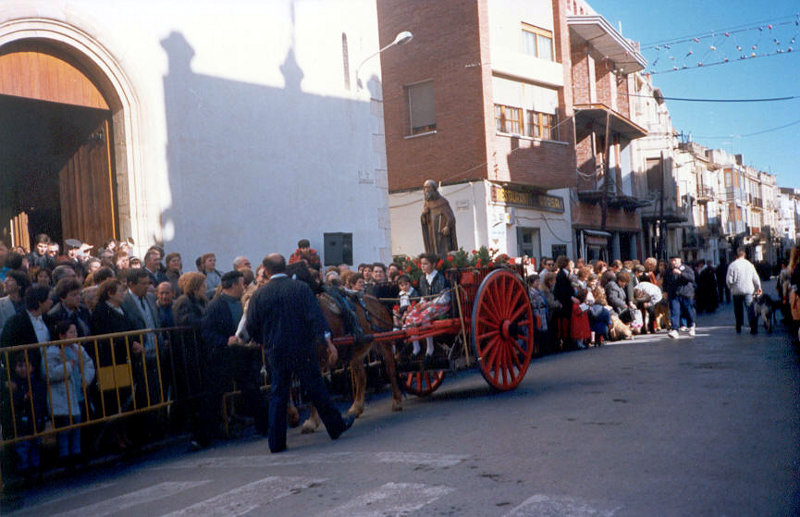
- Main square: a local festival in honor of Saint Anthony

- Flag Coat of arms

- Location in Catalonia
- Coordinates: 40°43′01″N 0°29′52″E
- Country: Spain
- Community: Catalonia
- Province: Tarragona
- Comarca: Montsià

Government
  - mayor: Alfred Blanch Farnós (2015)

Area
  - Total: 28.2 km^{2} (10.9 sq mi)
- Elevation: 79 m (259 ft)

Population (2025-01-01)
  - Total: 3,871
  - Density: 137/km^{2} (356/sq mi)
- Demonym(s): Planer, planera
- Postal Code: 43138
- Area code: (+34) ...
- Vehicle registration: T
- Website: santabarbara.cat

Santa Bàrbara (Catalan pronunciation: [ˈsanta ˈβaɾβaɾa]) is a municipality in the comarca of Montsià in Catalonia, Spain.

Santa Bàrbara is part of the Taula del Sénia free association of municipalities. It has a population of 3,871 (register office, 2025).

== Geography ==
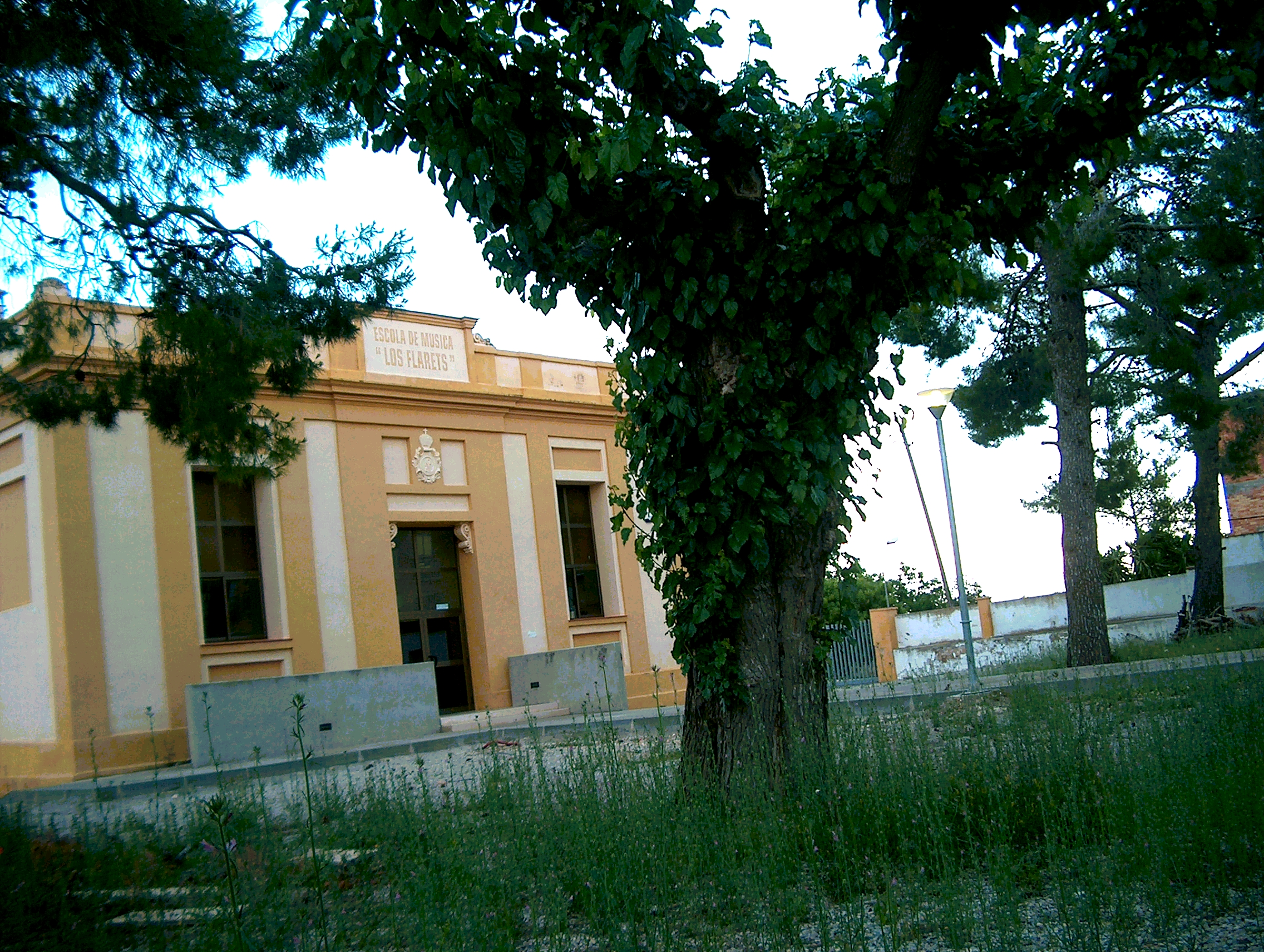
The music school

This town is located in a plain at the northern end of the Serra de Godall, at the crossing of the roads between Tortosa and Ulldecona and between Amposta and La Galera. It was an important resting point for wayfarers and transhumant cattle herders using the system of ancient passages known as lligallos in the past. The town had roadside inns where travelers could rest and recover from the day's journey and it still has some mid-range hotels and restaurants.

The Renfe railway line from Valencia to Tortosa used to pass through this town before 1990. Since the Tortosa-Ferreries-Roquetes-Vinallop-Santa Bàrbara section of the line was eliminated, the rails were pulled off and the Santa Bàrbara train station buildings lie abandoned 40.7150°N 0.5054°E.
