= Peñarroya =

Peñarroya is the name of several places:

- Peñarroya de Tastavins, a town in Aragón, Spain
- Peñarroya-Pueblonuevo, a town in Andalusia, Spain
  - Peñarroya CF, a Peñarroya-Pueblonuevo football team
- Peñarroya (peak), a 2,019 m high mountain peak in the Sistema Ibérico
