= Ulldecona =

- Municipality
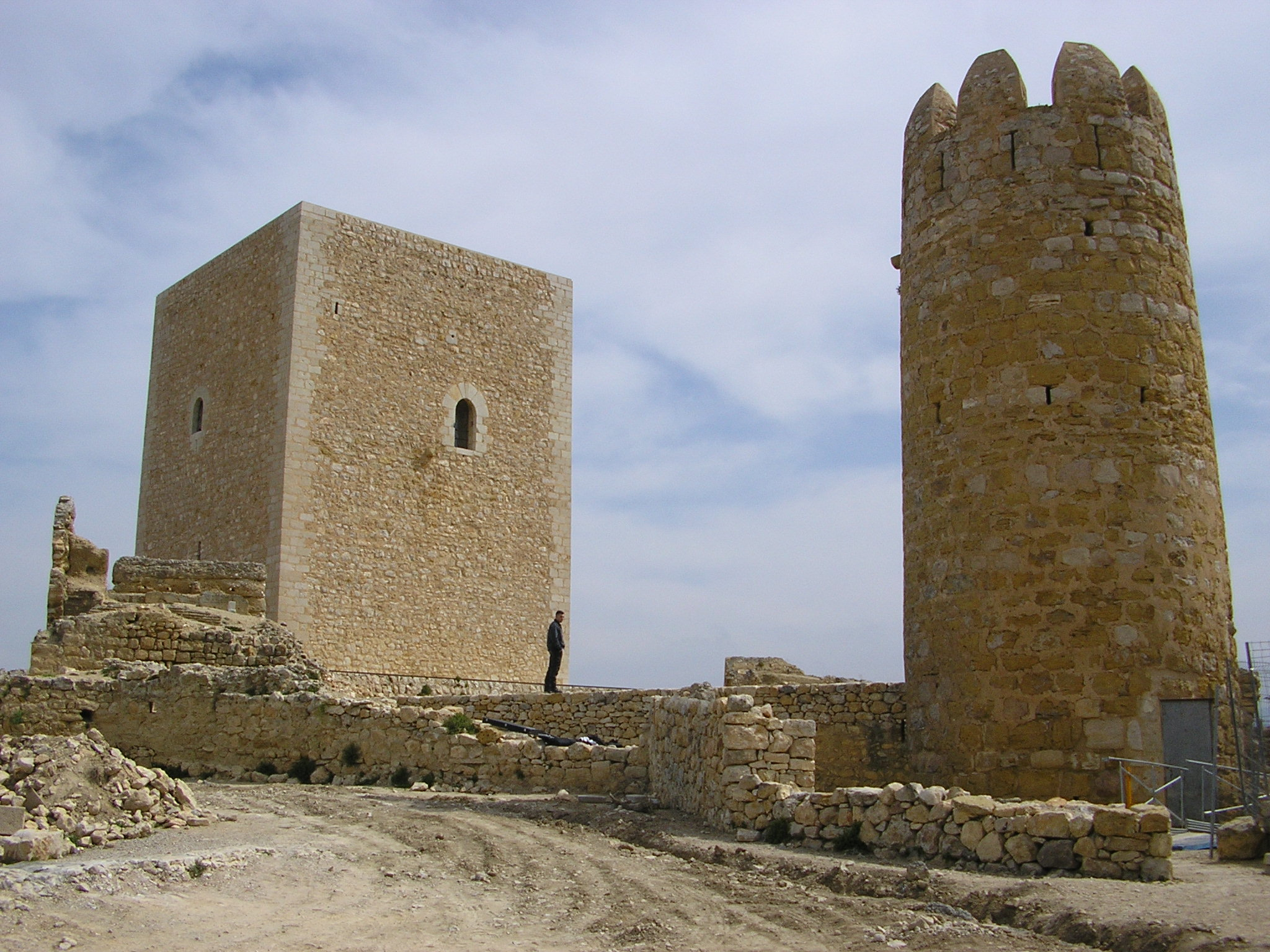

- Flag Coat of arms

- Location in the Province of Tarragona Ulldecona (Catalonia) Ulldecona (Spain)
- Coordinates: 40°35′58″N 0°26′47″E
- Country: Spain
- Community: Catalonia
- Province: Tarragona
- Comarca: Montsià

Government
  - Mayor: Núria Ventura Brusca (2015)

Area
  - Total: 126.9 km^{2} (49.0 sq mi)
- Elevation: 133 m (436 ft)

Population (2025-01-01)
  - Total: 6,714
  - Density: 52.91/km^{2} (137.0/sq mi)
- Demonym(s): Ulldeconenc, ulldeconenca Faldut, falduda
- Website: ulldecona.cat

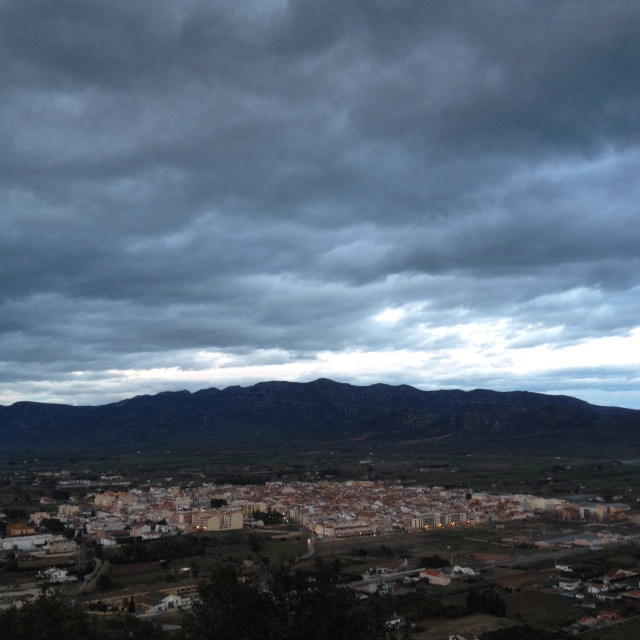
View of Ulldecona with the Montsià Range in the background

Ulldecona (Catalan pronunciation: [ˌuʎðeˈkona]) is a municipality in Catalonia, Spain. It is located in the southern part of the province of Tarragona, in the comarca of Montsià. It has a population of 6,714 (register office, 2025). It has had town privileges since 1273.

The nearest towns are: Alcanar, La Ràpita, Freginals, Godall, La Galera, Mas de Barberans and Cenia in the Montsià region; and Vinaròs, Traiguera, Sant Jordi and San Rafael del Río in Baix Maestrat. Important tourist areas are also nearby, such as Salou and Peniscola.

== Administrative divisions ==
The town has a main population centre and five smaller villages within its administrative perimeter:

- Ulldecona, 5286
- Els Valentins, 272
- El Castell, 257
- Sant Joan del Pas, 173
- Les Ventalles, 39
- La Miliana, 29

== Economy ==
Traditional local agriculture was based on the produce of the numerous olive, almond and carob trees of the area, as well as fruit and vegetable crops. The furniture, construction and service sectors are also of relative importance.

In recent years the quarrying of marble, from the Serra de Godall hills has become a major income earner for the town. Quarried since ancient times, the stone of Ulldecona has been used in the construction of important public works in Spain, such as the Pedrera in Barcelona, the Town Hall in Zaragoza and the airport of Madrid. Presently it is also exported to different countries, such as the US (Hilton Hotel in Los Angeles), France, Switzerland (Town Hall of Geneva), South Korea, Saudi Arabia and China.

== Culture and social life ==
The most important customs in Ulldecona are staging of processions with gegants, musical bands and pubilles, as well as traditional dances and the releasing of bulls in the streets (bous).

The Passió d'Ulldecona is a yearly festival reenacting the Passion of Jesus staged by local people, including a live donkey and real palm and olive branches.

=== Sports ===
One of the most important sports in Ulldecona is football. Ulldecona has its own football club, the Club de Futbol Ulldecona, with ten teams and 200 players. The first team plays nowadays in the 1a Regional League. Other important sports are five-a-side football, basketball, twirling and table tennis.

Adam Raga, from Ulldecona, has been the World Indoor Trial Champion in 2003, 2004 and 2005.

2012 UEFA Champions League Final winner Oriol Romeu who plays for Barcelona is a native of Ulldecona. Spain international Aleix García who plays for Bayer Leverkusen also hails from the town.

== Medieval Castle ==
The Medieval Castle, declared a Castle of Cultural Interest, can be found on the top of a hill known as Mount of the Castle, which is part of the Serra de Godall.

The visibility and the fertility and wealth of the land were features that increased the strategic value of this area.

The oldest remains that have been discovered show that that area was already populated during the Iberian era, between the 5th and the 1st centuries before Christ. Arabic peoples settled there during the 9th century and they started to build some of the buildings whose remains can be seen nowadays in the area. Ramon Berenguer IV conquered the south of the current territory of Catalonia in the 12th century and the medieval buildings started to be built.

The castle was inhabited until the end of the 13th century, when the people from Ulldecona started to settle in the plain.

In 1986, the Town Council bought the Castle.

== See also ==
- Ulldecona Dam
