= Florencio Pla Meseguer =

Spanish guerrilla fighter (1917–2004)

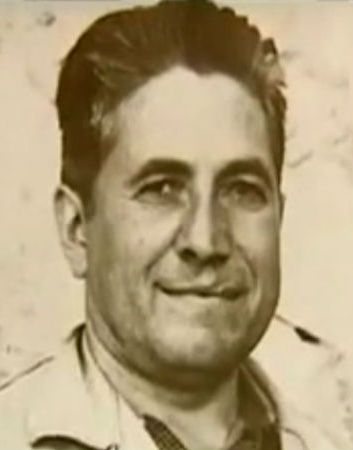
- Born: Teresa Pla Meseguer; February 1, 1917; Vallibona, Spain
- Died: January 1, 2004 (aged 86); Olocau, Spain
- Other names: La Pastora, Durruti, Teresot
- Occupations: Shepherd, guerrilla fighter, smuggler
- Known for: Intersex condition

Florencio Pla Meseguer, known as La Pastora ("The Shepherdess") (Teresa Pla Meseguer; February 1, 1917 – January 1, 2004), was an intersex Spanish fighter in the Maquis, the anti-fascist guerrilla resistance during and after the Spanish Civil War. Born in the village of Vallibona, province of Castellón, Florencio became a symbol of defiance against both political oppression and rigid gender roles. His journey through the Maquis and his eventual legal recognition as a man after years of imprisonment represents a story of personal transformation and resistance.

== Early life and background ==
Florencio was born as Teresa Pla Meseguer on February 1, 1917, in Vallibona, a remote village in the province of Castellón. He was the youngest of seven siblings, growing up in a small farmhouse known as Mas de la Pallissa, inherited from his grandfather. Florencio's father, José Pla Abella, died when he was just three years old. With life proving harsh, Florencio began working at a young age, tending the family's sheep and goats Due to his remote upbringing, he received little formal education, attending school briefly just long enough to take his First Communion.

Florencio's intersex condition became a significant factor in the decisions made about his future. A family friend, aware of the potential difficulties Florencio might face in fulfilling military service due to his physical condition, advised his father to have him registered as female in the civil registry. As a result, Florencio was officially named Teresa Pla Meseguer, a decision that would shape much of his life and identity. Despite being assigned female at birth and being socially forced to wear women's clothing, Florencio always identified more closely with male roles. He also displayed very masculine behavior and, especially after puberty, developed a distinctly masculine appearance. Initially, he was called Teresot ('big Tereso') behind his back, but in later years, before joining the Maquis, people began addressing him as Teresot openly, and he no longer took offense.

== Joining the Maquis ==
Florencio's first encounters with the Maquis, the resistance fighters against Franco's dictatorship, took place while he was living in the mountains. Although he had been largely isolated from the political struggles of the time, he occasionally interacted with Maquis fighters who passed through the area. A turning point came when, during a snowstorm, three Maquis fighters sought refuge in a remote summer house, El Cabanil. The Civil Guard tracked them down and burned the house.

On the morning of the burning, the Civil Guard, having learned of Florencio's intersex condition and driven by nothing more than their curiosity, subjected him to a humiliating encounter, forcing him to strip, as at this point they had no reason to suspect he had any involvement with the Maquis. As Florencio recounted,

"Tenien curiositat per saber com una pastora era meitat home i meitat dona. [...] El «teniente Mangas» va fer cas omís de totes les regles i em van fer despullar, em van fer emportar fins que van assaciar la seua curiositat. I quan van acabar, em van dir: «bueno, a hacer bondad». I vaig sentir molta ràbia, molta impotència."
"They were curious to see how a shepherdess could be half man and half woman. [...] 'Lieutenant Mangas' ignored all protocol and made me undress until their curiosity was satisfied. When they finished, they said, 'Well, behave yourself.' I felt such rage, such impotence."

The following day, the Civil Guard arrested the owner of El Cabanil. Fearing that he, too, would face reprisals, Florencio fled. This series of events left him with a deep sense of rage and injustice, prompting him to join the Maquis as both a political statement and a way to align with his own identity, fully embracing a male role within the resistance. In his own words:

Jo ja havia volgut presentar-me a la guerra voluntari, amb els rojos, per veure si em podia fer amb la documentació d'home, perquè jo anava pel carrer i tots deien: mira, si pareix un home.
"I had already wanted to volunteer for the war, with the Reds, to see if I could get male documentation, because when I walked down the street, everyone would say: look, she looks like a man."

Upon joining the Maquis in 1949, at the age of 32, Florencio started dressing as a man, cut his hair in a masculine style combed back, and took on the alias Durruti in honor of the legendary anarchist leader, Buenaventura Durruti. 'La Pastora' is the alias given to him by the Civil Guard and the press, and, consequently, it became the name by which the public would know him. Although some sources mistakenly label him as a leader, he clarified that his role was more modest. He was required to complete three months of military training before beginning his operations as a maqui.

== Fighting for a lost cause ==
By the time Florencio joined the guerrilla resistance, the Maquis had become a lost cause, a reality he would come to realize quickly. After World War II, the anti-Franco guerrilla fighters faced dwindling international support as global priorities shifted toward the Cold War. By 1947, George F. Kennan concluded that Franco's regime was too entrenched to be removed without military intervention. Instead, the U.S. pivoted to supporting Franco as a bulwark against communism. This policy shift was exemplified by the first U.S. financial credit to Spain, approved in early 1949 and materialized in 1951. Spanish diplomats like José Félix de Lequerica facilitated this alignment, lobbying effectively in Washington and emphasizing Franco's strategic value in the Cold War context.

These developments left the Spanish Maquis increasingly isolated, their efforts diminished to a lost cause against a dictatorship now legitimized internationally. Under these circumstances, Florencio joined the guerrillas of the XXIII Sector of the Agrupación Guerrillera de Levante y Aragón (AGLA), led by Jesús Caelles Aymerich, known as Carlos el Catalán. During the long hours in the camp, José González López, known as Rubén, taught him to read, while Francisco Serrano Iranzo, known as Francisco or Rubio, helped shape his ideological orientation. In return, Florencio taught them how to navigate the rugged region he knew intimately.

He spent twenty months with the Maquis, but as the situation became increasingly dire, morale dwindled. Fellow fighters were killed, captured, deserted, or simply disappeared. Meanwhile, relations with civilians deteriorated. Caught between the fascist state and the guerrillas, civilians faced severe risks. Supporting the Maquis could lead to imprisonment, torture or death, while resisting them often resulted in raids, making it impossible to convince the Civil Guard that such robberies weren't staged to cover missing resources. Seeing no future in their struggle, Francisco Serrano Iranzo suggested to Florencio that they desert to save their lives. Florencio agreed, and on October 7, 1950, they left the Maquis behind.

== Fugitive ==
They spent the winter committing robberies, intending to cross into France with the proceeds. However, possibly fearing retribution from the Communist Party as deserters, they chose to stay in Spain, becoming bandits until Francisco's death on August 2, 1954. Following Francisco's demise, Florencio lived in complete solitude for two years, avoiding all contact and leaving no traces. In September 1956, he finally made his way to Andorra. To support himself, he worked as a shepherd and engaged in small-scale smuggling of tobacco and nylon. However, he was eventually apprehended in 1960 after being betrayed by a former associate.

== Incarceration and gender identity ==
Following his capture, Florencio was handed over to Spanish authorities. Before his trials, Florencio was initially placed in a women's prison due to his legal status as a woman. This caused him significant personal distress, as he was forced to wear women's clothing again and endure solitary confinement. But this situation didn't last long, because a few days later, he was presented before the forensic doctors at the Military Hospital in the Valencia Police Station. They reported that Teresa Pla Meseguer, La Pastora, was, in fact, a man whose "defective" genital condition classified him as a case of 'male pseudohermaphroditism.'Transcript of the report:

Primera.— El individuo reconocido pertenece al sexo masculino.
Segunda.— La constitución de sus órganos genitales es defectuosa, presentando un hipospadias perineal y un escroto bífido que, junto a las reducidas dimensiones del pene, hacen que sea clasificable entre los casos de pseudohermafroditismo masculino.
Tercera.— Dado su sexo gonadal, no debe ser recluido en la cárcel de mujeres por ser peligrosa su convivencia con individuos del sexo contrario al suyo.
First.— The individual in question belongs to the male sex.
Second.— The constitution of his genital organs is defective, presenting a perineal hypospadias and a bifid scrotum, which, along with the reduced size of the penis, make him classifiable among cases of male pseudohermaphroditism.
Third.— Given his gonadal sex, he should not be confined in a women's prison due to the danger of cohabiting with individuals of the opposite sex.

Following this, he was transferred to the men's prison to await his first trial.

== Trials and misattribution of crimes ==
Florencio was subjected to two court-martials in 1960 and 1961. The first, held by the military tribunal of Tarragona, sentenced him to 25 years for each of two armed robberies in Paüls and Tortosa. The second, in Valencia, accused him of "banditry and terrorism" under the 1947 Ley de Bandidaje y Terrorismo (Law on Banditry and Terrorism). Without evidence, prosecutors linked him to six murders and sought the death penalty. Both Florencio and his defense argued he had not participated in killings and only acted as a lookout during robberies.

Although initially sentenced to death in March 1961, his penalty was commuted to 30 years' imprisonment the following month. After being incarcerated in Valencia for several years, he was transferred to El Dueso prison in 1968, where his good conduct allowed him to reduce his sentence. In July 1977, with the help of Marino Vinuesa Hoyos, a prison official who advocated for his pardon, he was released. Florencio moved to Vinuesa's house in Olocau, where he lived until his death on January 1, 2004.

== Post-release and legacy ==
After his release, he underwent a legal process to have his identity officially recognized as male and his name changed from Teresa to Florencio, receiving his official documentation as a man on March 25, 1980. Returning to Vallibona, he was met with acceptance and support from local residents. Despite the hardships he faced, Florencio's life story, marked by resilience in the face of gendered prejudice and political strife, continues to resonate as a symbol of defiance and self-determination in the struggle against oppressive regimes and societal norms.

== In popular culture ==
=== Vinuesa's unpublished book and Villar Raso's novel ===
Marino Vinuesa Hoyos wrote a book about Florencio based on interviews conducted during his imprisonment in Valencia, intending to publish it later. Seeking assistance, he entrusted the manuscript to Manuel Villar Raso. However, Villar Raso transformed the work into a novel, adding his own passages and emphasizing sensational aspects such as Florencio's intersex condition and alleged sexual behavior in guerrilla camps. The book was ultimately published without Vinuesa's consent and solely under Villar Raso's name.

Published in 1978 under the title La Pastora: el maqui hermafrodita, the book included 32 pages allegedly copied from Vinuesa's manuscript, prompting a plagiarism lawsuit. Additionally, Villar Raso's embellishments led to another lawsuit for defamation. Vinuesa criticized the novel, stating, "Everything, except the barbarities he added, is taken from my work." He accused Villar Raso of creating a sinister image of Florencio, despite never meeting him.

"...dice que cuando mataron a Francisco Serrano Iranzo, Francisco / Rubio, que yo me senté en la falda y lo estuve masturbando. [...] imagine usted, que la mujer o las propias hijas lean una cosa así..."
"...he tells that when Francisco Serrano Iranzo, Francisco / Rubio, was killed, I sat on his lap and was masturbating him. [...] imagine if his wife or his own daughters were to read something like that..." (Florencio is expressing his outrage here over one of the most egregious fabricated sexual encounters in Villar's narrative, in which he is depicted as masturbating Francisco, alias Rubio, to death after the latter was shot.)

=== Books ===
- Villar Raso, Manuel (1978). La Pastora: el maqui hermafrodita (in Spanish).
- Calvo Segarra, José (2009). La Pastora, del monte al mito (in Spanish). This investigative journalism publication stands as the most comprehensive source on his life.
- Giménez Bartlet, Lucia (2011). Donde nadie te encuentre (in Spanish). Premio Nadal.
- Silva Tomás, Valeriano (2015). Yo conocí a La Pastora: posguerra y maquis en Castellón (in Spanish).
- Rolón Collazo, Lissette (2021). En fuga. Florencio Pla Meseguer, memoria, poder y resistencia (in Spanish).
- Solanas, Elena (2023). Florencio Pla la Pastora: La dignitat robada (in Catalan).

=== Theater ===
- Porcar, Laia and Vizcarro, Núria (2018). Instruccions per a no tenir por si ve La Pastora (in Catalan). La Ravalera Teatre. Finalist in the 22nd edition of the Premios Max (2019).

=== Film and television ===
- Siempre será la Pastora (in Spanish, France, 2004); documentary directed by Ismael Cobo.
- L' Ombra de la Pastora (in Catalan, Spain, 2011); espisode 557 in the documentary series Dossiers in Canal Nou.
- Florencio Pla Meseguer, 'la Pastora' (1917-2004) (in Catalan, Spain, 2019); second season, episode 23 in the documentary series Valentes.
- Les Vides de La Pastora (in Catalan, Spain, 2021); documentary directed by José Antonio Guerrero Navarrete.
- Els Mals Noms (in Catalan, Spain, 2025); film directed by Marc Ortiz Prades.

=== Music ===
- Pastora (in Catalan, 2015); song by the Spanish folk punk band Ebri Knight.
- No s'apaguen les estreles (in Catalan, 2020); song by the Spanish ska and folk rock singer-songwriter Xavi Sarrià.
- 'La Pastora' aka Florencio (in Spanish, 2022); song by the Spanish band Aina Palmer.
