= Sant Jaume d'Enveja =

- Municipality
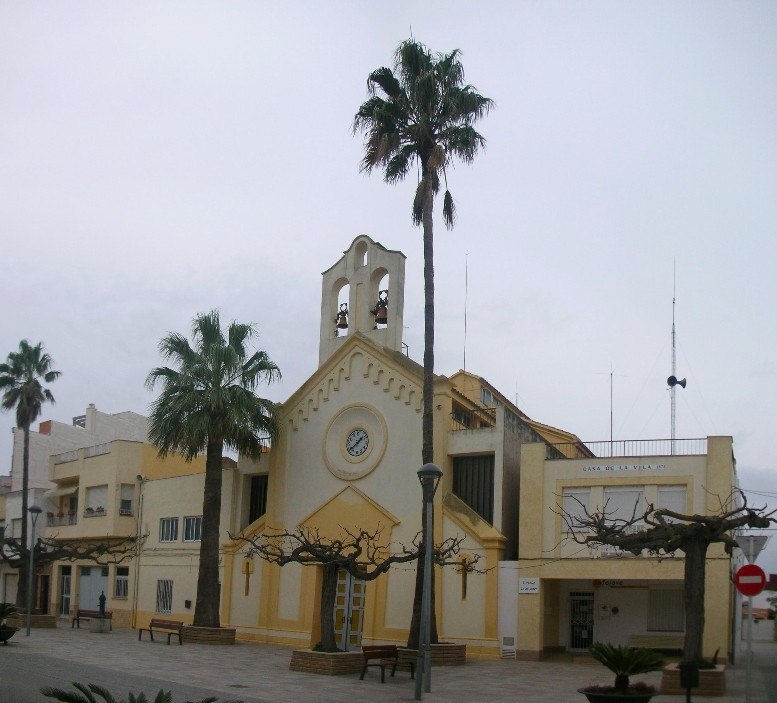
- Sant Jaume d'Enveja's main church with its large bell-gable

- Flag Coat of arms

- Location in Catalonia Sant Jaume d'Enveja (Catalonia) Sant Jaume d'Enveja (Spain)
- Coordinates: 40°42′15″N 0°43′10″E
- Country: Spain
- Community: Catalonia
- Province: Tarragona
- Comarca: Montsià

Government
  - Mayor: Maria Teresa Solsona Beltri(2023)

Area
  - Total: 60.8 km^{2} (23.5 sq mi)
- Elevation: 7 m (23 ft)

Population (2025-01-01)
  - Total: 3,745
  - Density: 61.6/km^{2} (160/sq mi)
- Demonym: Santjaumer
- Postal code: 43877
- Website: santjaume.org

Sant Jaume d'Enveja (Catalan pronunciation: [ˈsan ˈdʒawme ðamˈbejʒa]) municipality in the comarca of the Montsià in Catalonia, Spain. It is situated in the southern half of the Ebre/Ebro Delta, on the right bank of the river. It has a population of 3,745 (register office, 2025).

The municipality was created in 1978: previously the territory formed part of the municipality of Tortosa.

It is linked to Amposta by a local road, and to Deltebre on the opposite bank by a service of barges.

The town was established relatively recently in the 1860s. This is due in part to the formation of the delta over the last few centuries from the river's sedimentary deposits.

The town's economy is centred on agriculture, principally rice cultivation, along with a strong tourism industry. The latter has seen an expansion in recent years based on the attractive countryside offered by the River Ebre Delta national park and its biodiversity. There is a lighthouse on the island of Buda.

== Villages ==
- Balada, 10
- Els Muntells, 495
- Sant Jaume d'Enveja, 2787

== Bibliography ==
- Panareda Clopés, Josep Maria; Rios Calvet, Jaume; Rabella Vives, Josep Maria (1989). Guia de Catalunya, Barcelona: Caixa de Catalunya. ISBN 84-87135-01-3 (Spanish). ISBN 84-87135-02-1 (Catalan).
