= Freginals =

- Municipality
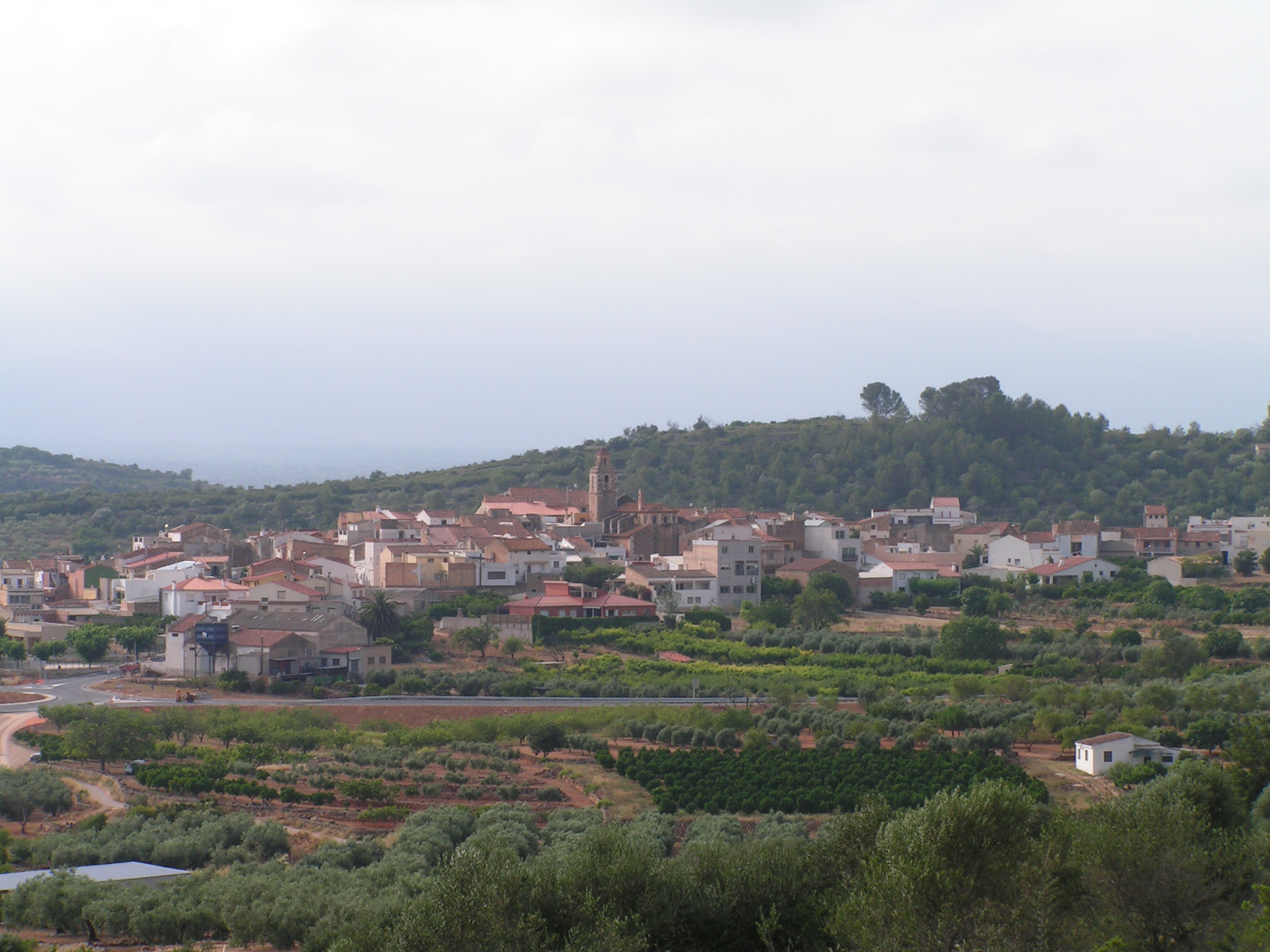

- Flag Coat of arms

- Location in Catalonia Freginals (Catalonia) Freginals (Spain)
- Coordinates: 40°40′23″N 0°31′17″E
- Country: Spain
- Community: Catalonia
- Province: Tarragona
- Comarca: Montsià

Government
  - mayor: Josep Roncero Pallarés (2015)

Area
  - Total: 17.6 km^{2} (6.8 sq mi)
- Elevation: 79 m (259 ft)

Population (2025-01-01)
  - Total: 443
  - Density: 25.2/km^{2} (65.2/sq mi)
- Demonym(s): Planer, planera
- Postal code: 43138
- Website: freginals.info

Freginals (Catalan pronunciation: [freʒiˈnals]) is a municipality in the comarca of Montsià in Catalonia, Spain. It has a population of 443 (register office, 2025).

This town is located on a hill between the northern end of the Serra de Godall and the Serra del Montsià, not far from the forking of the roads between Tortosa, Ulldecona and Amposta. The area around the town has ancient passages of transhumant cattle herders known locally as lligallos.

The Renfe railway line from Valencia to Tortosa used to have a railway station in this town before 1990, but the station is now closed.

Freginals is part of the Taula del Sénia free association of municipalities.
