= Alcanar =

- Municipality
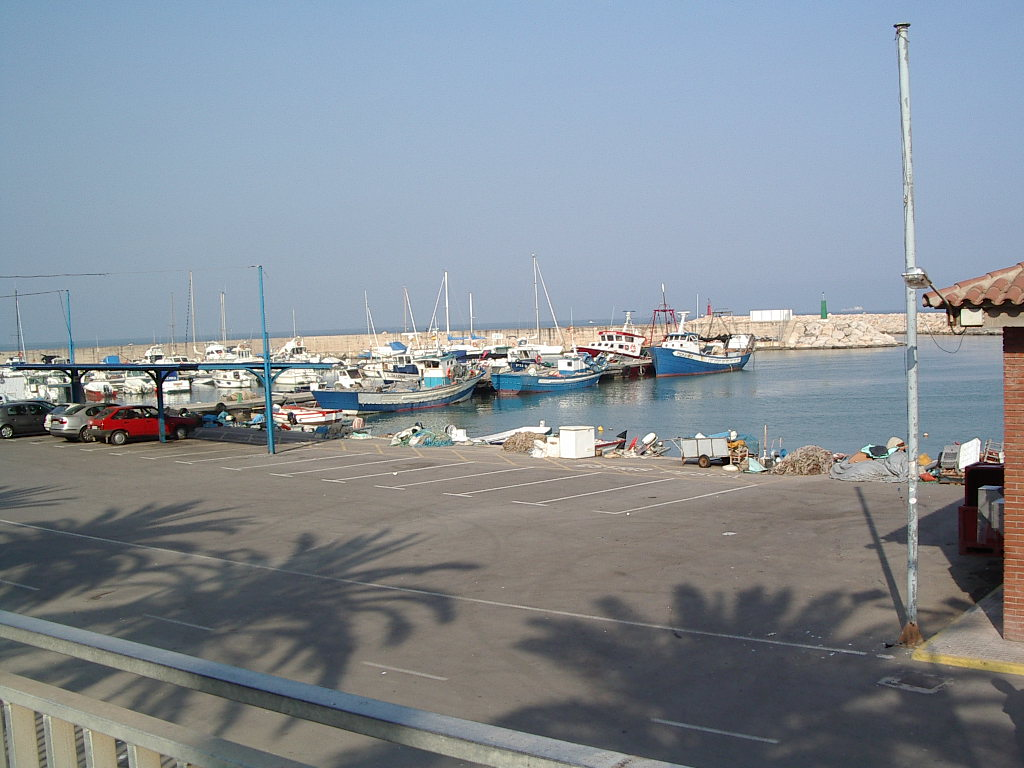
- Alcanar's harbour

- Flag Coat of arms

- Location of Alcanar Alcanar (Catalonia) Alcanar (Spain)
- Coordinates: 40.544°N 0.482°E
- Country: Spain
- Autonomous community: Catalonia
- Province: Tarragona
- Comarca: Montsià

Government
  - Mayor: Alfons Montserrat Esteller (2015) (ERC)

Area
  - Total: 47.1 km^{2} (18.2 sq mi)
- Elevation: 72 m (236 ft)

Population (2025-01-01)
  - Total: 10,104
  - Density: 215/km^{2} (556/sq mi)
- Demonym: canareus
- Time zone: UTC+1 (CET)
  - Summer (DST): UTC+2 (CEST)
- Postal code: 43530
- Website: www.alcanar.cat

Alcanar (Catalan pronunciation: [alkaˈna]) is a Spanish municipality of the Catalan comarca of Montsià, in the Tarragona province. It is a coastal town on the Mediterranean Sea. The Serra del Montsià range and its foothills rise above the town and its surroundings. It has a population of 10,104 (register office, 2025). It is the southernmost town in Catalonia, located just north of the border with the municipality of Vinaròs which is in the province of Castellón and part of the region of Valencia.

== Villages ==
- Alcanar, 7,494
- Alcanar-Platja, 988
- Les Cases d'Alcanar, 1,391
- La Selleta, 96

== History ==
It was not until the fifteenth century that Alcanar was incorporated as an independent town, but it had been populated for a long time before then. From 1148 the town was part of the municipality of Ulldecona. After it was granted independence, it received the name of the Canar, which originates from republic of its inhabitants.

The original charter was granted in February 1239, however the settlement did not stabilise until it was granted a new charter in 1252, the date regarded as the real foundation of the town. In 1380, the village already contained thirty families, and they were subjected to various attacks by Saracen pirates, which led to the construction of a lookout tower in the fourteenth century. As a precaution, the town was fortified and walled. In 1449, the town became independent of Ulldecona.

During the war against John II of Castile, the town was occupied by troops of the king, who burned the town. During the reign of Philip II, various defense towers were built to repel attacks by Turkish pirates, and Alcanar was again fortified.

In the Catalan Revolt of 1640–59, the town remained loyal to the king of Castile, which led to occupation of the city by Catalan troops. A similar event occurred during the Peninsular War. Later, during the First Carlist War, the city was besieged. It was captured and looted by Carlist troops who held a strong position in the town for a time.

On July 11, 1978, a tanker truck carrying flammable liquid exploded in front of the Camping de los Alfaques located at the coast, outside the town, killing 217 people, injuring more than 300 and completely devastating the campsite.

On August 16, 2017, an explosion in a house outside of the town, at the coast, killed two people and injured another. The next day, August 17, there was a second explosion. Later it was learned that those killed and wounded were terrorists and the explosion was caused by bombs built by the jihadist cell responsible for the 2017 Barcelona attacks.

== Culture ==
The Alcanar parish church dedicated to Saint Michael (Sant Miquel in Catalan or San Miguel in Spanish) is a major feature of the municipality. The church is built in the Renaissance style, with a single nave and side chapels; it originally consisted of four bays with a semicircular apse, which disappeared in some nineteenth century rebuilding. It was then expanded with a transept, dome base and a sanctuary. It currently measures 19 metres wide and has a total height of 16 metres. The access door is a half-point arch framed by two columns, and at the top are three niches framed by a triangular pediment. The belltower has a square base and windows on each side.

On the outskirts of the village is a shrine devoted to the Mare de Déu del Remei (Our Lady of Good Remedy). It was built in the late sixteenth century and early seventeenth in a Gothic style. In the eighteenth century, a belltower, a crossing and a dome were added and the interior was expanded. Next to the shrine is the building of the former guest house in which retains a mosaic that represents the battle of Lepanto. The mosaic was part of the floor of the chapel until it was removed in the early nineteenth century, and as a result is very deteriorated. The image is venerated at the shrine is a small class of about 60 centimetres of the eighteenth century. The temple interior is decorated with a series of paintings made in 1920. The former altar pieces and part of the decoration were destroyed in 1936.

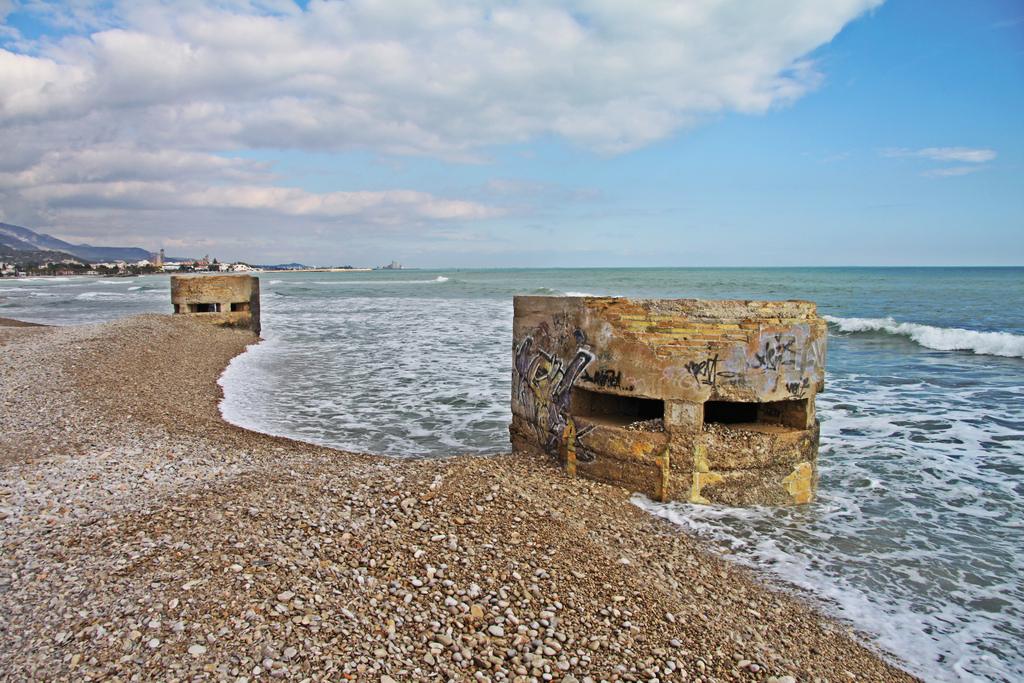
Bunkers in Estanyet's Beach, near Alcanar, built during the Spanish Civil War to protect the Catalan coast against a possible francoist landing.

Along the coast are the defence towers, which were built between 1530 and 1630 to fend off pirates. They are all square, with door with voussoir, floor and vault. Most of them have been renovated, and are now used as houses or summer residences.

== Economy and tourism ==
Tourism and second homes are a prominent factor in the Alcan economy. Near the Alcanar Beach, many housing developments have been built that increase the number of tourists during the summer months. One of the oldest summer residences is known as Clos de Codorniu, and once was home to King Alfonso XIII of Spain. It also has several hotels and campsites and other facilities designed to cater to tourism.

Most tourists stay at the old and relatively quiet fishing village of Les Cases d'Alcanar or in Alcanar-Platja during the summer season. The small settlement of La Selleta was built by Germans on a hill below the Serra del Montsià in the last half of the 20th century.

Agricultural activity continues to develop in the northern town, the furthest from the coast, mainly growing crops of oranges and clementines. Fishing remains important in Alcanar's smaller villages, and they are especially dedicated to catching prawns.

The Port of Alcanar is a facility serving the cement plant on the southside of the town.

== See also ==
- Los Alfaques Disaster
