= Serra del Montsià =

Mountain range in Spain

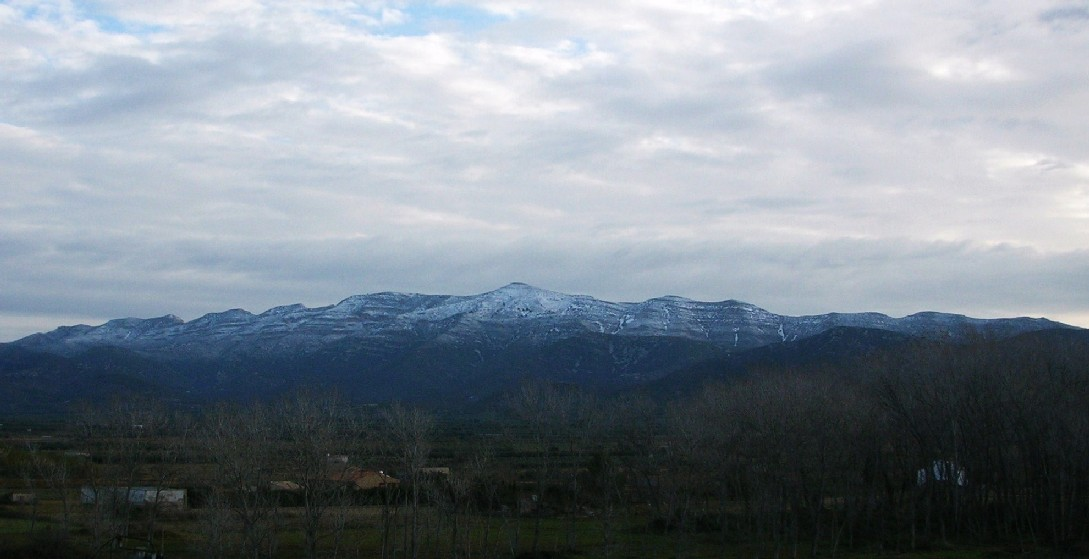

Highest point
- Elevation: 764 m (2,507 ft)
- Listing: Mountains in Catalonia
- Coordinates: 40°37′26″N 0°32′41″E

Geography
- Location within Catalonia
- Location: Montsià (Catalonia)
- Parent range: Catalan Mediterranean System, Southern zone

Geology
- Mountain type: karstic

Climbing
- Easiest route: drive

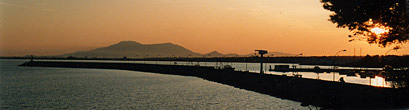
The Serra del Montsià seen at sunset from l'Ampolla harbor, 25 km away.

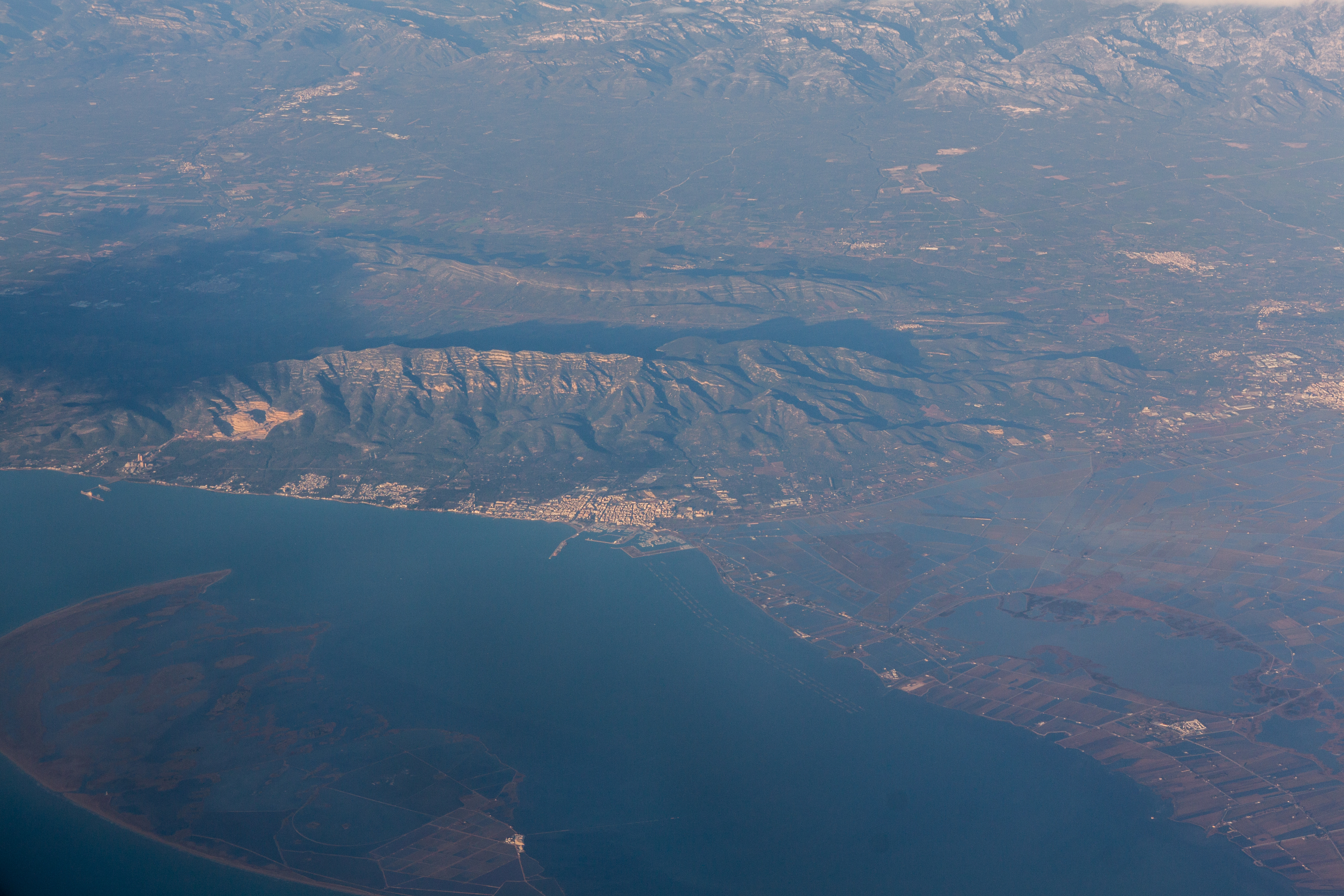
20141218 - Serra de Montsià - Air Photo by sebaso

Serra del Montsià (Catalan pronunciation: [ˈsɛrə ðəl munsiˈa]) is a 14.5 km long mountain range in Catalonia. It gives its name to the Montsià, the southernmost comarca (county) of Catalonia. Its highest point is 764 m high La Torreta.

The Serra del Montsià stretches in a NE - SW direction and lies south of the Ebre river, its northern limit. Relatively high and located right by the Mediterranean coastline, it is an important landmark in the region. Its southern limit is marked by the Sénia River. The silhouette of the mountain range looks like a dragon, especially seen from Santa Bàrbara town.

There are many remains of Iberian villages in some hills of this range. The small settlement of La Selleta was built by Germans on a hill below the Serra del Montsià in the last half of the 20th century.

== Ecology ==
This mountain range is covered with Maquis shrubland. The lower slopes are planted with olive, almond and carob trees. On the southeastern slope there is a large limestone quarry that has degraded a vast area.

The Serra del Montsià marks the northernmost limit of the Iberian Ribbed Newt distribution in the east of the Iberian Peninsula.

== Geology ==
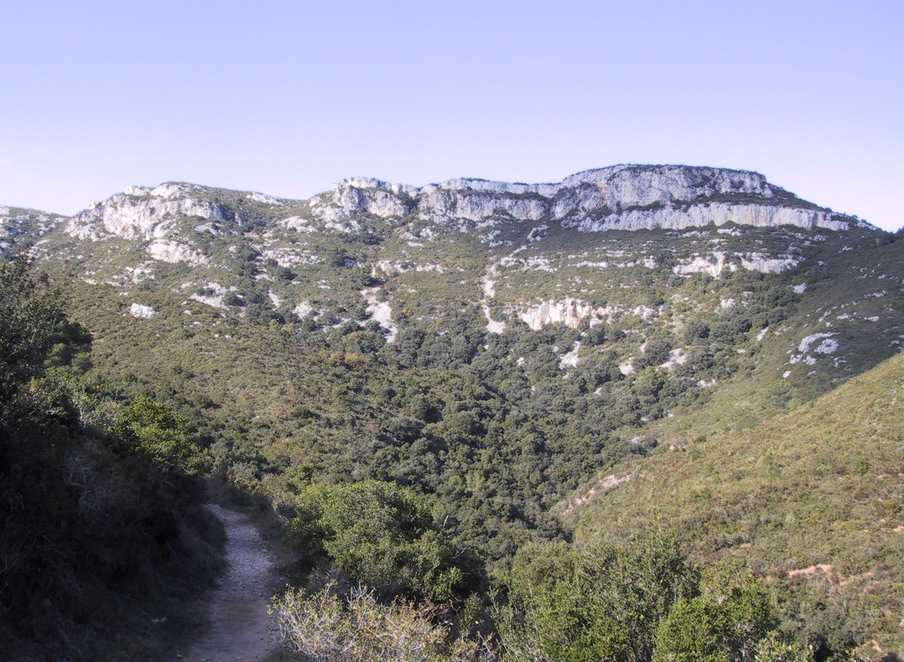
The Mata-redona, one of the main summits of the Montsià range

The Serra del Montsià is a karstic formation with numerous shafts and caves. Despite its seaside location it is part of the Catalan Pre-Coastal Range and formed 25 million years ago as part of the Alpine orogeny.

Its highest point, la Torreta del Montsià, rises to a height of 764 m; even so, the Mola cima, with its triangular profile, looks like the highest peak from many angles around Ulldecona, along the road between Barcelona and Valencia.

Other important peaks are la Foradada, located north of la Torreta, with magnificent views over the Ebre delta, and the rocky Mata-redona.

Geologically the section formed by the Serra del Montsià - Ulldecona/Freginals Valley - Serra de Godall is very similar to the section formed by the Talaies d'Alcalà - Santa Magdalena de Polpís/Alcalà de Xivert Valley - Serra d'Irta further south. These sets of parallel mountain ranges and valleys form the transition between the Catalan Mediterranean System and the Iberian System.
