= Masdenverge =

- Municipality
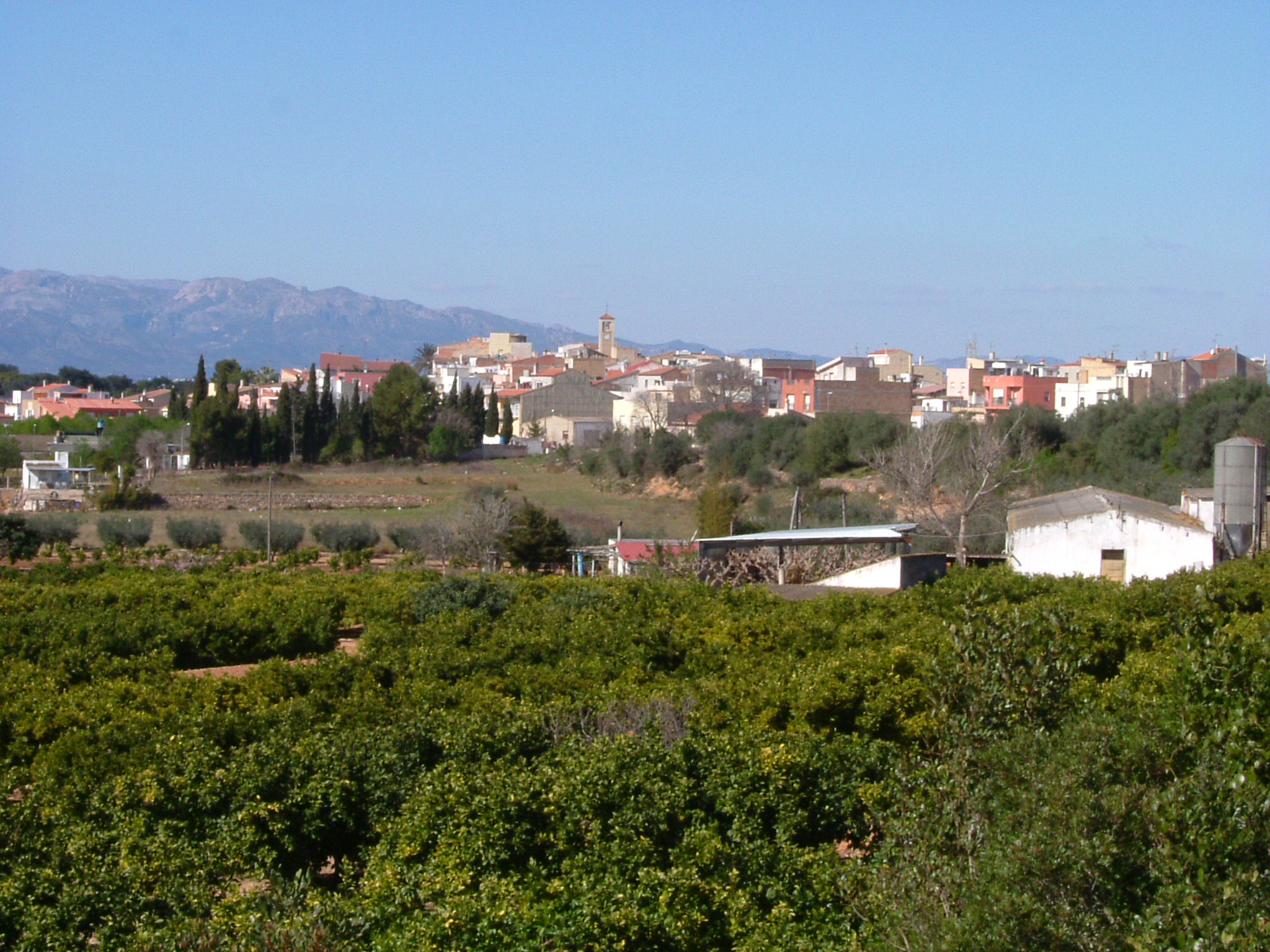
- Masdenverge

- Flag Coat of arms

- Location in Catalonia
- Coordinates: 40°43′N 0°32′E
- Country: Spain
- Community: Catalonia
- Province: Tarragona
- Comarca: Montsià

Government
  - Mayor: Álvaro Gisbert Segarra (2015)

Area
  - Total: 14.6 km^{2} (5.6 sq mi)

Population (2025-01-01)
  - Total: 1,138
  - Density: 77.9/km^{2} (202/sq mi)
- Website: masdenverge.cat

Masdenverge (Catalan pronunciation: [ˌmazdemˈbɛɾdʒe]) is a village in the province of Tarragona and autonomous community of Catalonia, Spain. It has a population of 1,138 (register office, 2025).
