= La Foradada (Montsià) =

Mountain of Catalonia, Spain

Coordinates: 40°37′48″N 0°32′28″E

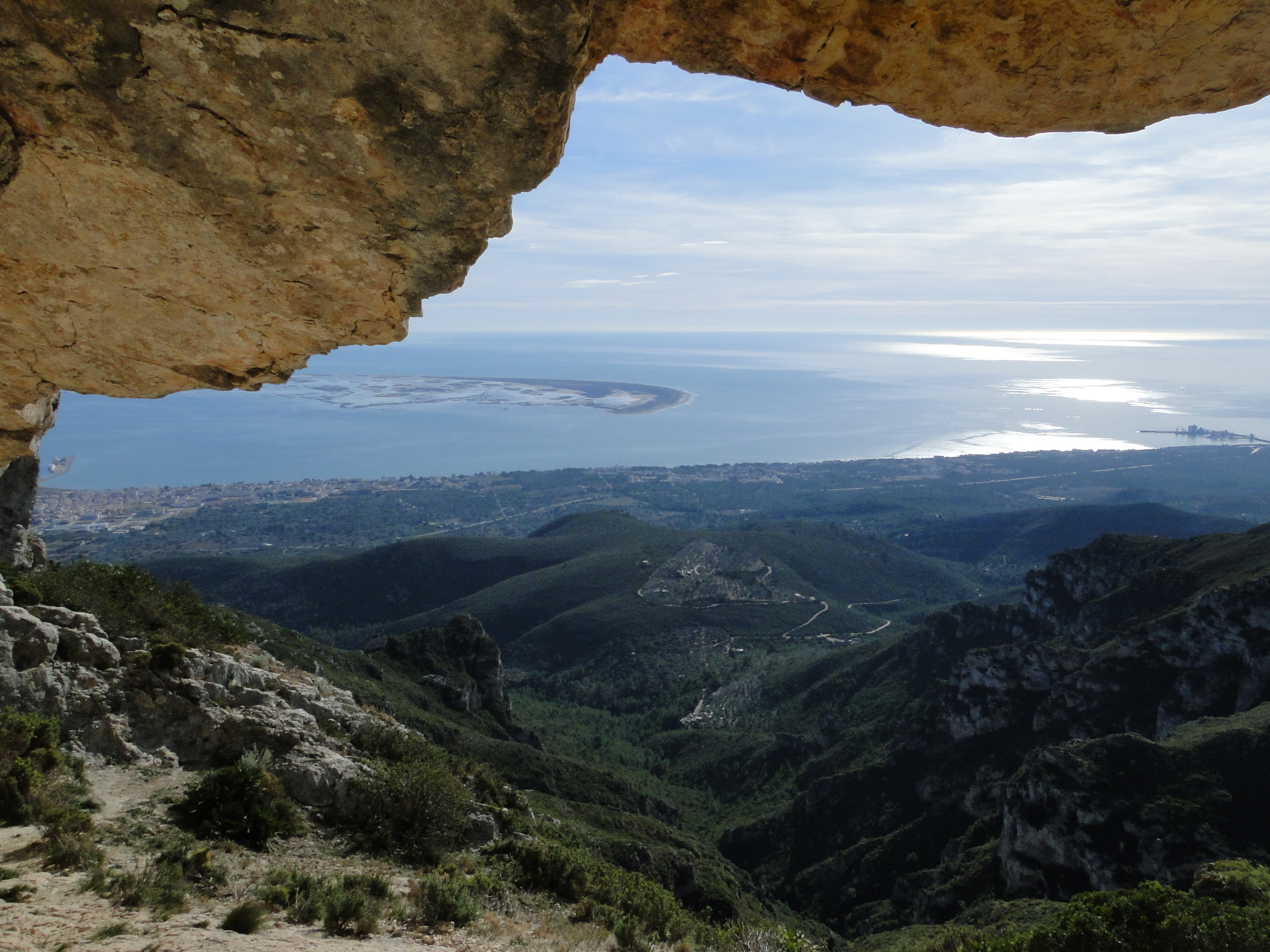

Highest point
- Elevation: 655 m (2,149 ft)

Geography
- Location: Catalonia, Spain

La Foradada (Montsià) is a mountain of Catalonia, Spain. It has an elevation of 655 metres above sea level.

== See also ==
- Mountains of Catalonia
