= Mas de Barberans =

- Municipality
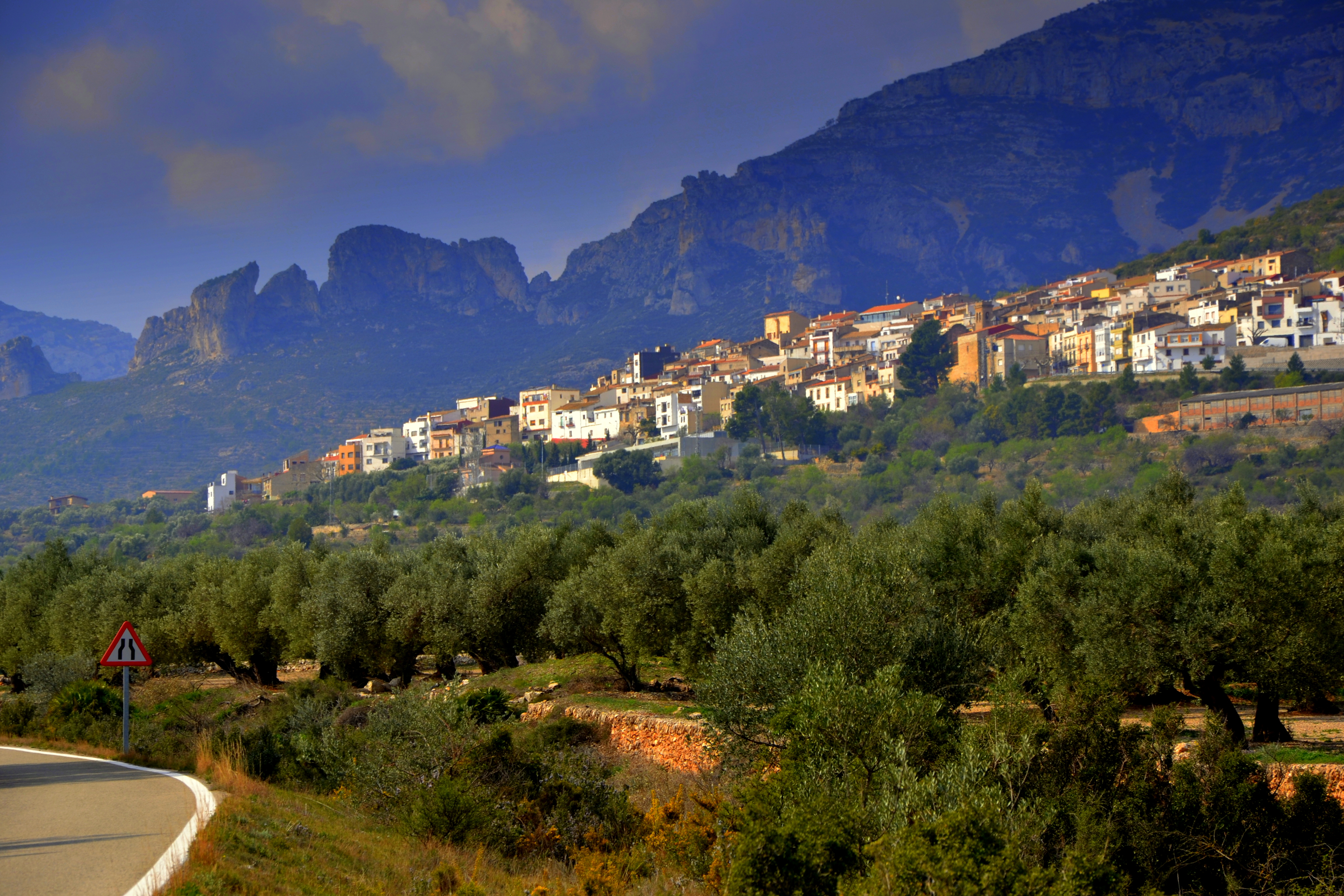
- Mas de Barberans

- Flag Coat of arms

- Location in Catalonia
- Coordinates: 40°44′09″N 0°22′23″E
- Country: Spain
- Community: Catalonia
- Province: Tarragona
- Comarca: Montsià

Government
  - mayor: Josep Maria Lleixà Lleixà (2015)

Area
  - Total: 78.8 km^{2} (30.4 sq mi)
- Elevation: 348 m (1,142 ft)

Population (2025-01-01)
  - Total: 535
  - Density: 6.79/km^{2} (17.6/sq mi)
- Postal code: 43077
- Website: masdebarberans.net

Mas de Barberans (Catalan pronunciation: [ˈmaz ðe βaɾβeˈɾans]) is a municipality in the comarca of Montsià in Catalonia, Spain. It is part of the Taula del Sénia free association of municipalities. It has a population of 535 (register office, 2025).

== Local crafts ==
This town is located at the feet of the eastern edge of the Ports de Tortosa-Beseit. The inhabitants have traditionally specialized in weaving and making basketry articles with the leaves of the Mediterranean Fan Palm, locally known as paumes. These leaves were gathered in the Ports mountainsides during the summer. This trade died down in the 1970s.

== See also ==
- Ports de Tortosa-Beseit
