= Vallibona =

- Municipality
- Coat of arms

- Location in Spain
- Coordinates: 40°36′10″N 0°03′13″W
- Country: Spain
- Autonomous community: Valencian Community
- Province: Castellón
- Comarca: Ports
- Judicial district: Vinaròs

Area
  - Total: 91.4 km^{2} (35.3 sq mi)
- Elevation: 666 m (2,185 ft)

Population (2025-01-01)
  - Total: 63
  - Density: 0.69/km^{2} (1.8/sq mi)
- Time zone: UTC+1 (CET)
  - Summer (DST): UTC+2 (CEST)
- Postal code: 12312
- Official language(s): Valencian

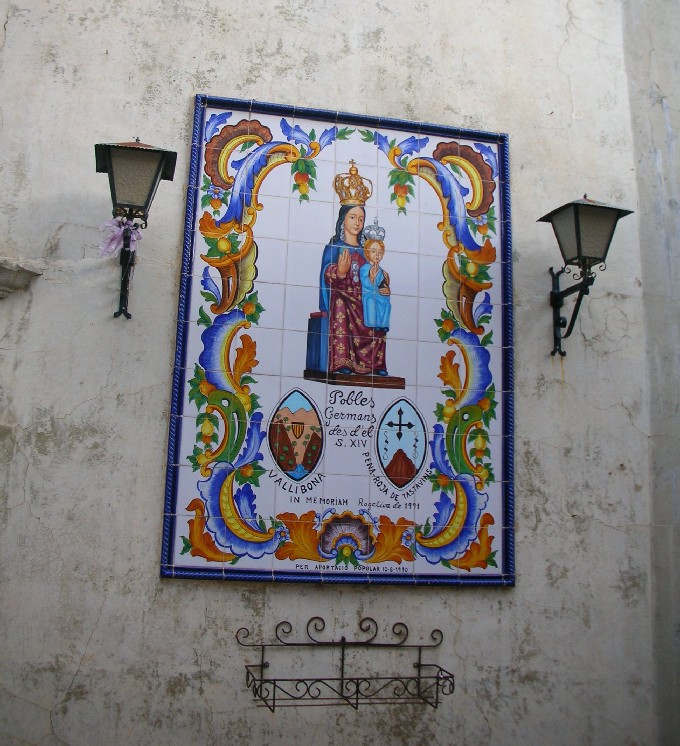
Virgin Mary on the wall of the main church honoring the traditional bonds between Vallibona and Pena-roja (Peñarroya de Tastavins) over the hills in Matarranya

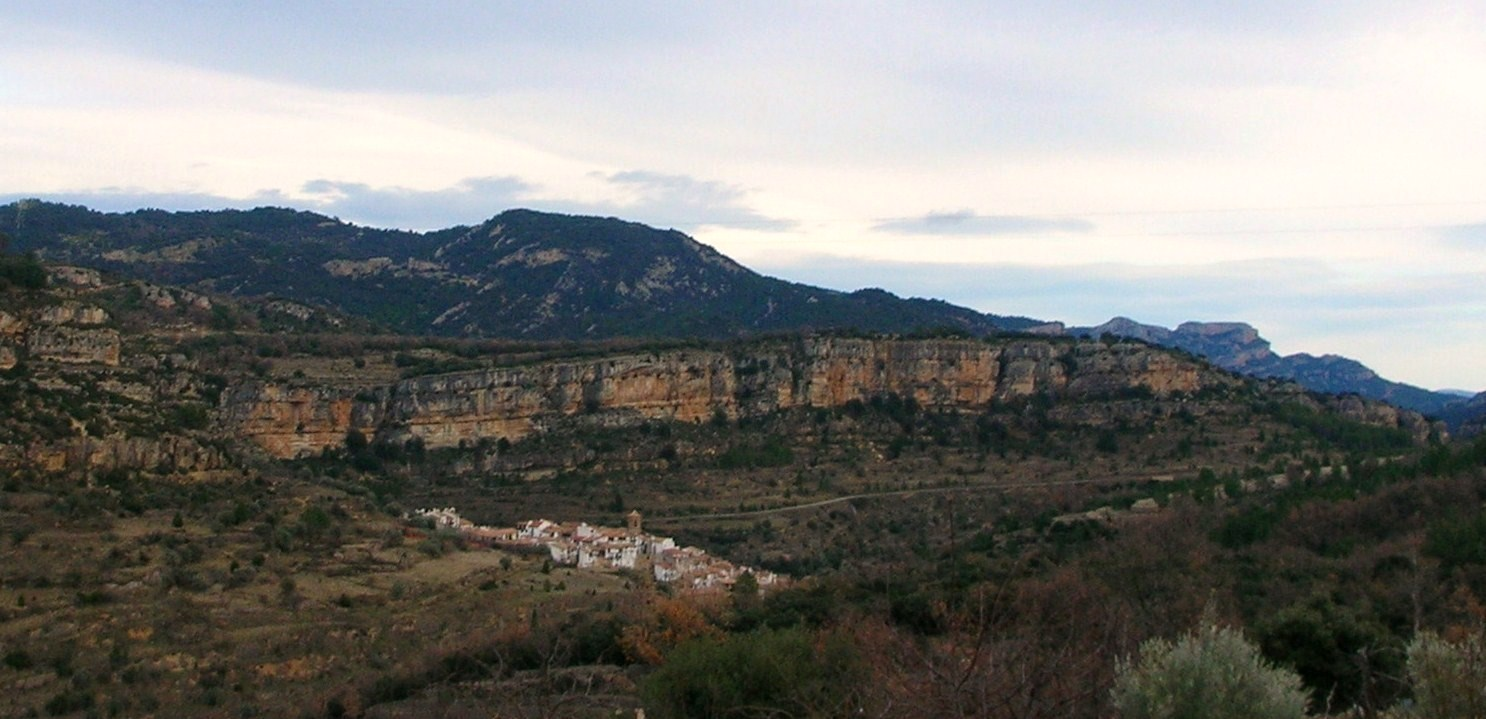
Vallibona seen from the west with the Ports de Morella in the background.

Vallibona (Valencian pronunciation: [ˌvaʎiˈbɔna]) is a small town and municipality located in the Ports comarca, province of Castelló, part of the autonomous community of Valencia, Spain. According to the 2009 census, it has a total population of 90 inhabitants. It is located in the upper valley of the Cérvol River, between the Serra del Turmell and the Ports de Beseit mountain ranges, in a very lonely area, relatively far from other towns. Vallibona is part of the Taula del Sénia free association of municipalities.

Vallibona has a special relationship with the town of Pena-roja (Peñarroya de Tastavins) over the hills in Matarranya. It has been recorded that festivities have been celebrated together with that town at least since the 14th century.

Sant Domènec de Vallibona is a small settlement with a church founded in 1237 located 12 km to the east, close to the road leading to Rossell.

Vallibona is the birthplace of Florencio Pla Meseguer (born Teresa Pla Meseguer, 1917–2004), a legendary intersex Maquis fighter, nicknamed "La Pastora" by the Civil Guard and the press.

This municipality should not be confused with Vallivana, a small settlement depending from Morella further SW.

== History ==
Vallibona was a Muslim town until nearby Morella was conquered by James I of Aragon in the 13th century.

The town has lost much population in the last 100 years; it had 1,808 inhabitants in 1900 and 1,133 in 1950. After General Franco's Plan de Estabilización in 1959 the population declined steeply as people emigrated towards the industrial areas of Barcelona and coastal Castelló Province. Other causes of the strong emigration have been the abandonment of traditional agricultural practices by the local youth, such as sheep and goat rearing, as well as the lifestyle changes that swept over rural Spain during the second half of the 20th century.

By 1994 Vallibona had only a residual population of 104 inhabitants, mostly in their old age. Nowadays the town derives some income from rural tourism. Vallibona revives during the summer season when many former residents return to the town to spend the holidays.

== See also ==
- Pena-roja

== Bibliography ==
- Teofil Pitarch i Vives, Fraternitas Saecularis: Vallibona/Pena-roja de Tastavins, Diputació de Castelló. 2005, ISBN 978-84-96372-12-2
