= Montsià =

Coordinates: 40°42′N 0°34′E

- Comarca
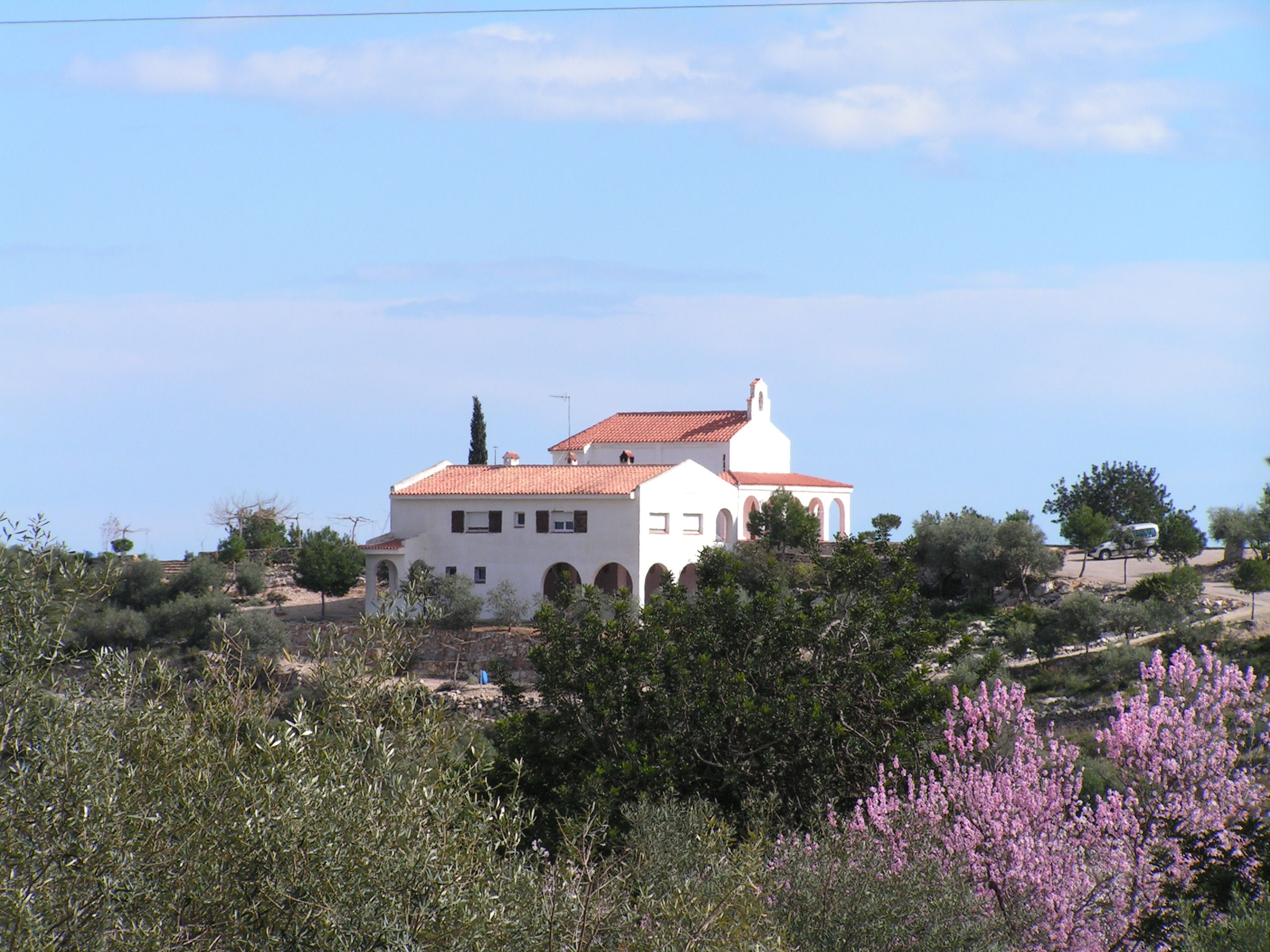

- Coat of arms

- Country: Spain
- Autonomous community: Catalonia
- Region: Terres de l'Ebre
- Province: Tarragona
- Capital: Amposta
- Municipalities: List: Alcanar, Amposta, Freginals, La Galera, Godall, Mas de Barberans, Masdenverge, Sant Carles de la Ràpita, Sant Jaume d'Enveja, Santa Bàrbara, La Sénia, Ulldecona

Government
  - Body: Montsià Comarcal Council
  - President: Sergi Guimerà (PSC)

Area
  - Total: 735.5 km^{2} (284.0 sq mi)

Population (2014)
  - Total: 69,613
  - Density: 94.65/km^{2} (245.1/sq mi)
- Demonym
- Time zone: UTC+1 (CET)
  - Summer (DST): UTC+2 (CEST)
- Largest municipality: Amposta

Montsià (Western Catalan: [monsiˈa]) is a comarca (county) of the Terres de l'Ebre region, in Catalonia (Spain). It is the southernmost comarca and its capital and largest city is Amposta.

== History ==
Almost all Montsià municipalities are part of the Taula del Sénia free association or mancomunitat (commonwealth).

== Municipalities ==
Municipality	Population (2014)	Area km^{2}
Alcanar	9,637	47.1
Amposta	21,197	138.3
Freginals	405	17.6
La Galera	800	27.5
Godall	673	33.6
Mas de Barberans	619	78.8
Masdenverge	1,106	14.6
La Ràpita	15,003	53.7
Sant Jaume d'Enveja	3,555	60.8
Santa Bàrbara	3,821	28.2
La Sénia	5,893	108.4
Ulldecona	6,904	126.9
• Total: 12	69,613	735.5

== See also ==
- Serra del Montsià
- Terres de l'Ebre
