= La Galera =

- Municipality
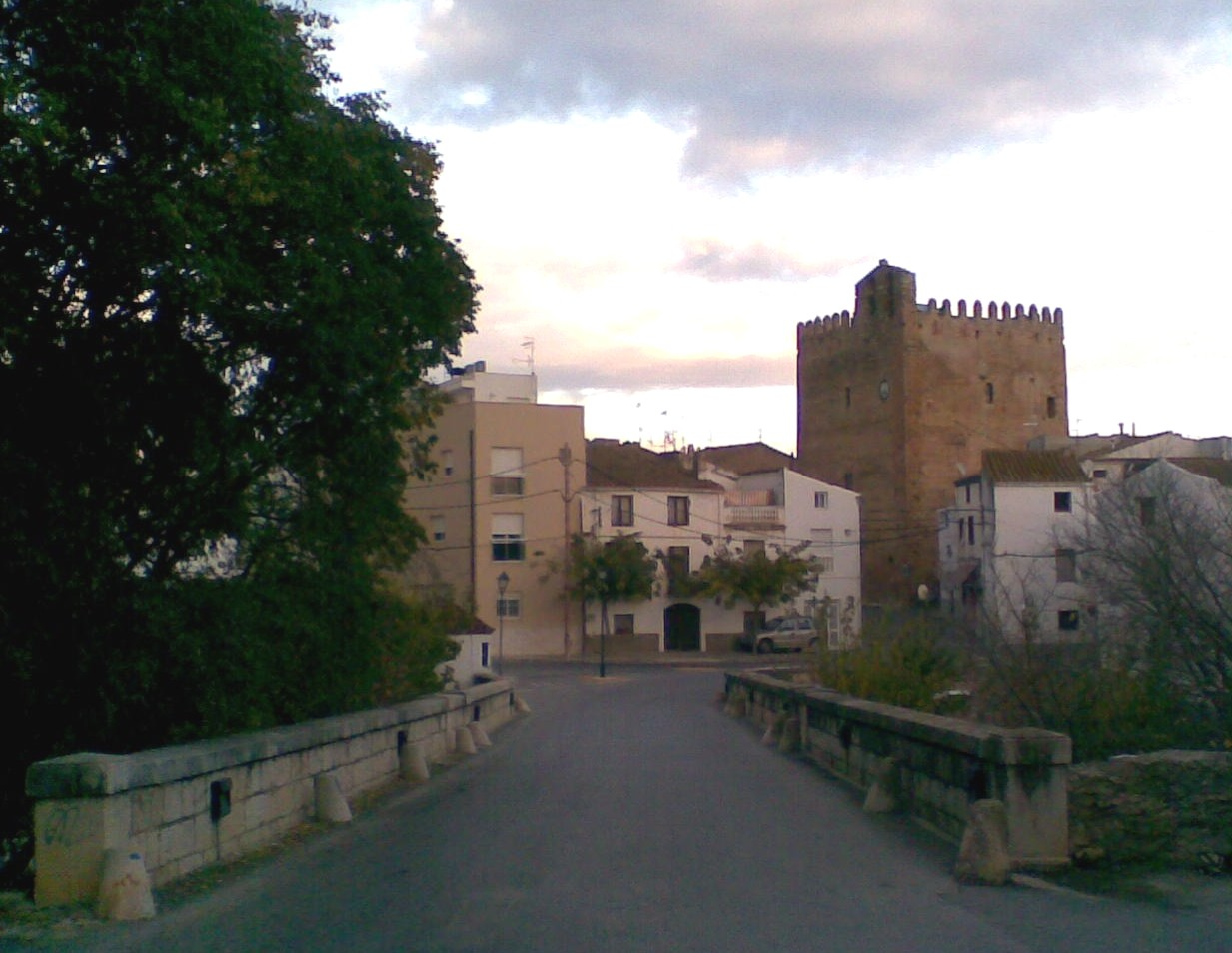
- Southern entrance of the village with the 14th century tower in the background

- Flag Coat of arms

- Location in Catalonia
- Coordinates: 40°41′00″N 0°27′49″E
- Country: Spain
- Autonomous Community: Catalonia
- Province: Tarragona
- Comarca: Montsià

Government
  - Mayor: Ramon Muñoz Verge (2015)

Area
  - Total: 27.5 km^{2} (10.6 sq mi)
- Elevation: 120 m (390 ft)

Population (2025-01-01)
  - Total: 726
  - Density: 26.4/km^{2} (68.4/sq mi)
- Demonym(s): Galerenc, galerenca
- Postal code: 43515
- Website: galera.cat

La Galera (Catalan pronunciation: [la ɣaˈleɾa]) is a municipality in the comarca Montsià, in the province of Tarragona, Catalonia, Spain. It has a population of 726 (register office, 2025). La Galera is part of the Taula del Sénia free association of municipalities.

== History ==
Although it has not been possible to prove it with documents, some historians believe that La Galera has an ancient Roman origin.

However, the earliest documentary evidence about the town is in 1320 when James II of Aragon authorized the control of the village known as Pobla de la Galera to the Archbishop of Tortosa. It is believed that the population had begun to establish itself here by 1303.

== Main sights ==
The most famous building is the Tower of La Galera. It was built in 1340 as a watchtower and it was built by the residents of the town. It has a rectangular base and a considerable height. In 1684 the interior was converted into a parochial church, dedicated to Sant Llorenç. The reform of the temple was left in suspense during the War of Spanish Succession, when the tower served as a military storehouse. The consecration of the new church took place on August 15, 1711.

== Culture ==
During the 17th century, potters came to live in the town, which has become a local artisan tradition. The town has a museum that explains the manufacture of clay vessels. During the month of May there is a festival of pottery.

La Galera celebrates its main festival in August.

== Economy ==
The main economic activity is agriculture, particularly olives, carob, wine, and almonds.

== Bibliography ==
- Tomàs Bonell, Jordi; Descobrir Catalunya, poble a poble, Prensa Catalana, Barcelona, 1994
- Article in the Catalan Encyclopedia
