= La Ràpita =

- Municipality
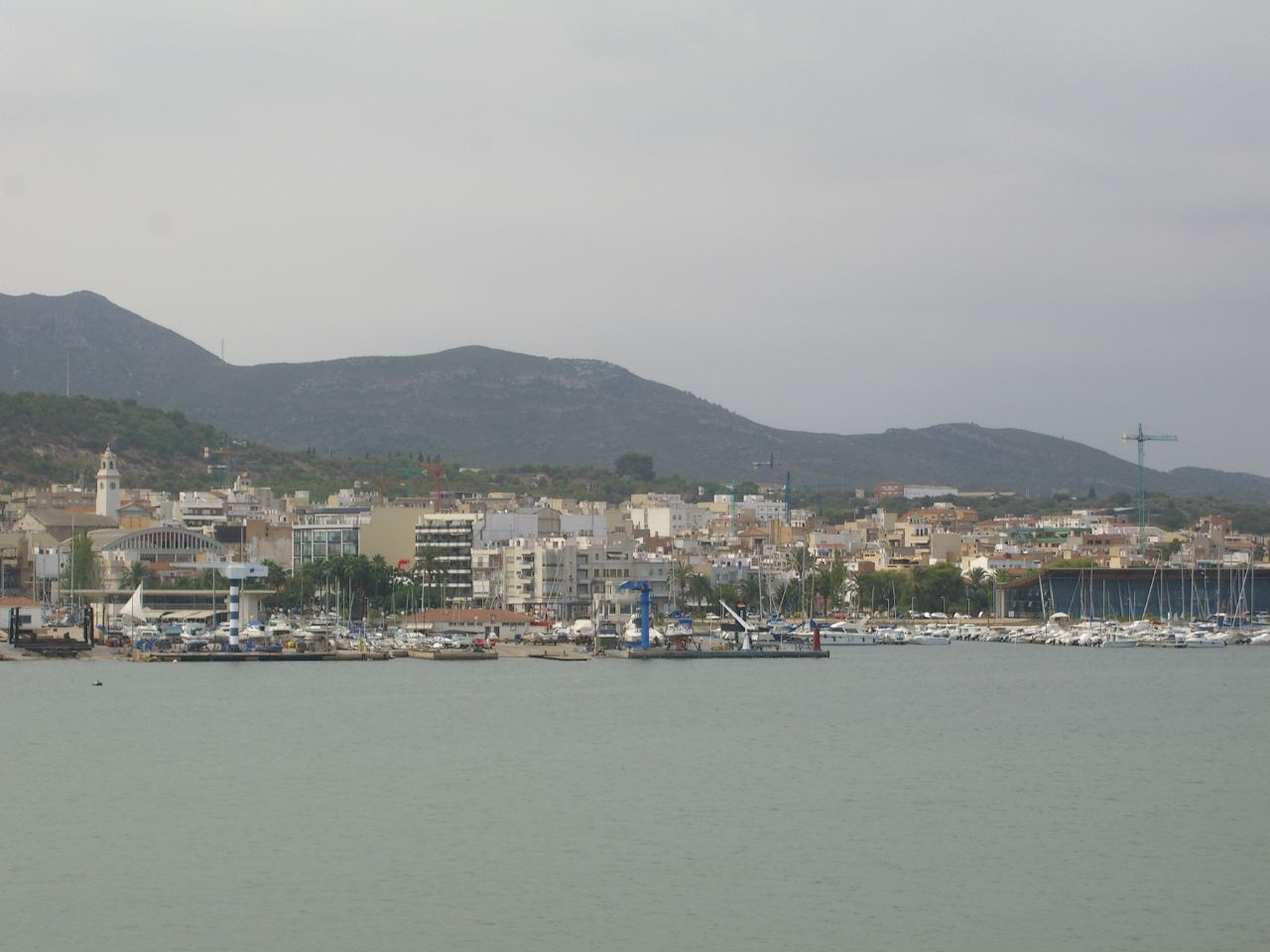

- Flag Coat of arms

- Location in Catalonia La Ràpita (Catalonia) La Ràpita (Spain)
- Coordinates: 40°37′00″N 0°35′30″E
- Country: Spain
- Community: Catalonia
- Province: Tarragona
- Comarca: Montsià

Government
  - Mayor: Josep Carles Caparrós García (2015)

Area
  - Total: 53.7 km^{2} (20.7 sq mi)
- Elevation: 11 m (36 ft)

Population (2025-01-01)
  - Total: 16,119
  - Density: 300/km^{2} (777/sq mi)
- Demonym(s): Rapitenc, rapitenca
- Website: www.larapita.cat

La Ràpita (Western Catalan: [la ˈrapita]) is a town in the area of the Montsià in Catalonia, Spain. The town covers a portion of the south-west of the Ebro Delta, including el Trabucador isthmus and la Banya peninsula, which close off a salt water lagoon known as the Port dels Alfacs. The town of La Ràpita is situated on the coast near the mouth of the lagoon. It was founded by Charles III of Spain as a port to serve trade with the Spanish colonies, and constructed in the neoclassical style of the period. However, much of the town remained uncompleted after Charles' death.

La Ràpita is part of the Taula del Sénia free association of municipalities. It is known for the production of rice and salt, and is also an important fishing port, particularly for shellfish and prawns, and a tourist centre. In the early years of the present century, the town experienced a huge urban development due to the construction of many apartments and residential buildings.

== Demography ==
It has a population of 16,119 (register office, 2025).

1900	1930	1950	1970	1986	2018
3901	6039	7960	8964	10,306	14,611

The town now hosts two large marinas, a beach, a market and many shops and restaurants. It is attractive and draws an increasing number of tourists each summer.
