= Godall =

- Municipality
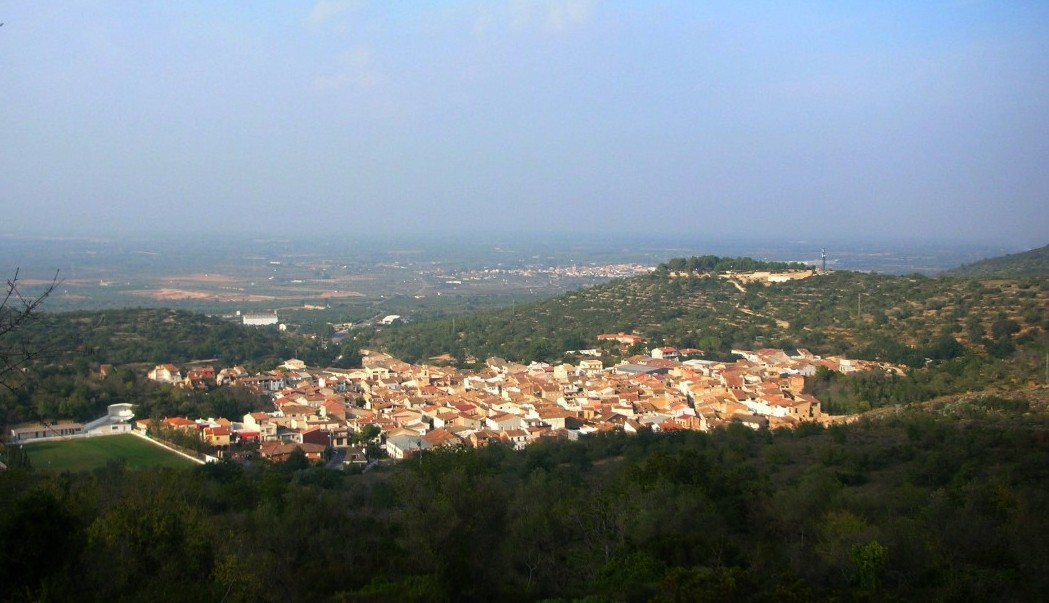
- Godall village

- Flag Coat of arms

- Location in Catalonia
- Coordinates: 40°39′25″N 0°28′13″E
- Country: Spain
- Autonomous Community: Catalonia
- Province: Tarragona
- Comarca: Montsià

Government
  - Mayor: Teresa Esmel Casanova (2015)

Area
  - Total: 33.6 km^{2} (13.0 sq mi)
- Elevation: 168 m (551 ft)

Population (2025-01-01)
  - Total: 591
  - Density: 17.6/km^{2} (45.6/sq mi)
- Demonym(s): Godallenc, godallenca
- Postal code: 43068
- Website: www.godall.altanet.org

Godall (Catalan pronunciation: [goˈðaʎ]) is a municipality in the Montsià comarca, Tarragona Province, Catalonia, Spain. It has a population of 591 (register office, 2025).

Godall gives its name to the Serra de Godall, a moderately high and smooth calcareous mountain range that rises above the town.

Local legend says that the village originated when people built a new settlement after abandoning the destroyed village of Merades, located within Godall's municipal term.
