= Peñarroya de Tastavins =

Peñarroya de Tastavins/Pena-roja
- Coat of arms

- Location of Peñarroya de Tastavins/Pena-roja within Aragon Location of Peñarroya de Tastavins/Pena-roja within Spain
- Coordinates: 40°45′18″N 0°2′23″E
- Country: Spain
- Autonomous community: Aragon
- Province: Teruel
- Municipality: Peñarroya de Tastavins/Pena-roja

Area
  - Total: 83 km^{2} (32 sq mi)
- Elevation: 761 m (2,497 ft)

Population (2025-01-01)
  - Total: 467
  - Density: 5.6/km^{2} (15/sq mi)
- Time zone: UTC+1 (CET)
  - Summer (DST): UTC+2 (CEST)

Peñarroya de Tastavins (Spanish: [peɲaˈroʝa ðe tastaˈβins]) or Pena-roja (Catalan: [ˈpena ˈrɔjʒa]) is a municipality located in the Matarranya comarca, province of Teruel, Aragon, Spain. According to the 2004 census (INE), the municipality has a population of 527 inhabitants. It is part of the Taula del Sénia free association of municipalities.

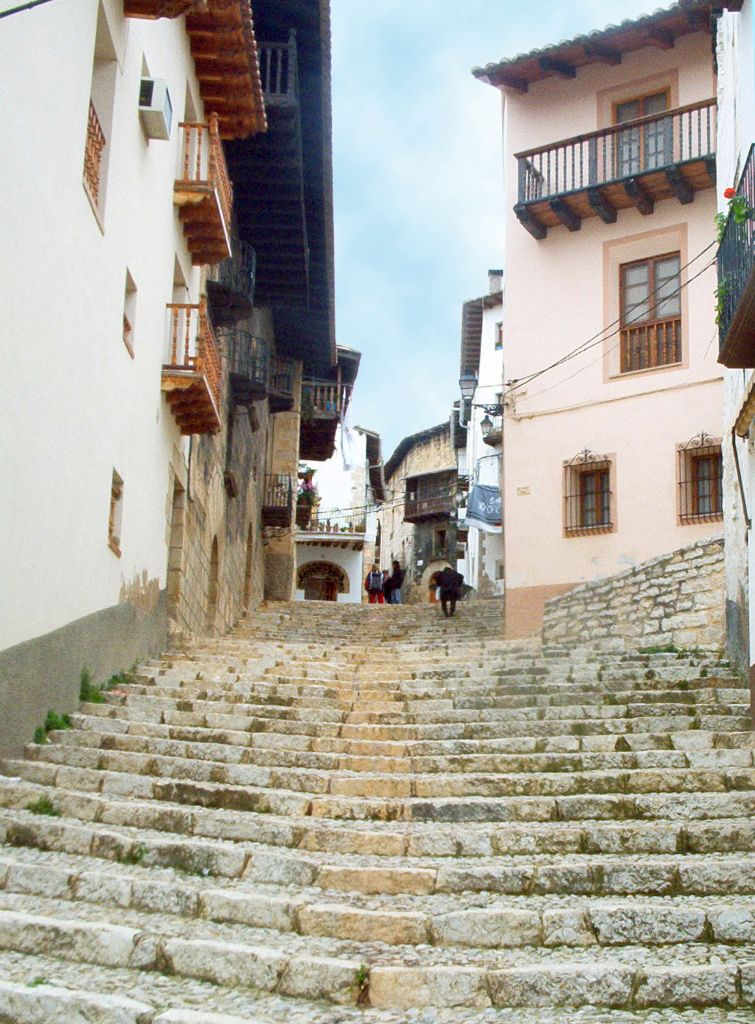
A steep street in the town

Pena-roja has a special relationship with the town of Vallibona over the hills in the Ports (comarca). It has been recorded that festivities have been celebrated together with that town at least since the 14th century.

== See also ==
- Ports de Tortosa-Beseit
- Vallibona
- List of municipalities in Teruel

== Bibliography ==
- Teofil Pitarch i Vives, Fraternitas Saecularis: Vallibona/Pena-roja de Tastavins, Diputació de Castelló. 2005, ISBN 978-84-96372-12-2
