= List of boiling liquid expanding vapor explosions =

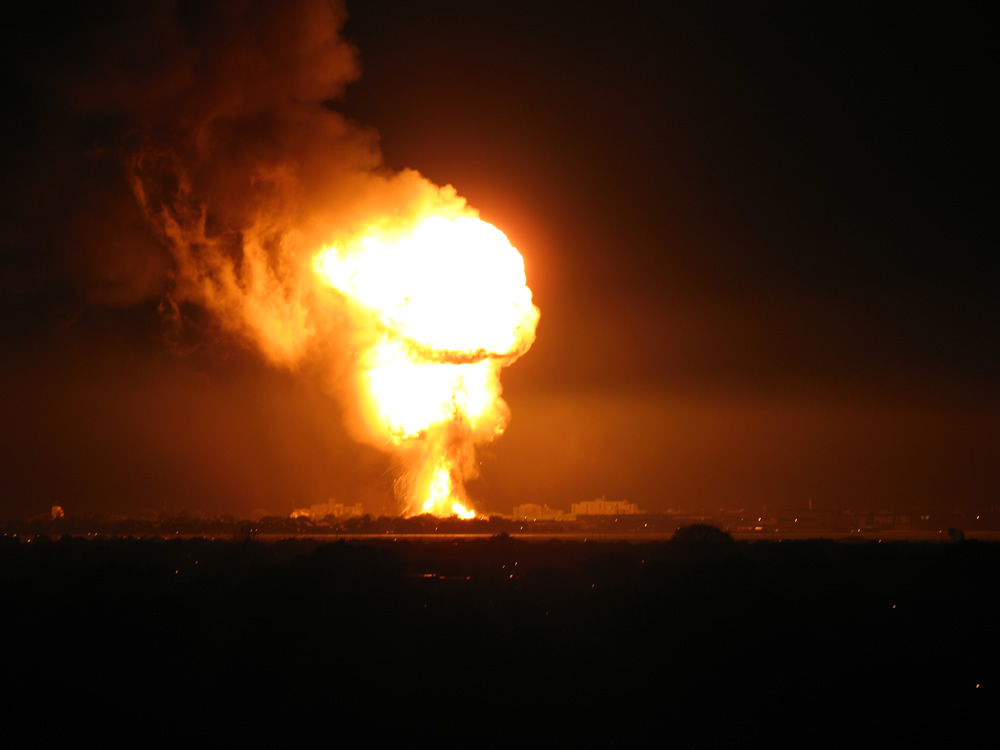
BLEVE–fireball, 2008 Toronto propane explosion

The following is a list of boiling liquid expanding vapor explosion (BLEVE) accidents. It shows whether the accident occurred during dangerous goods transportation or at a fixed facility, the accident origin (e.g., storage, process reactor, rail tank car, tank truck), the material involved, its amount, the number of fatalities, and whether a fireball developed (which is typically the case if the material is flammable).

Boiler explosions are not listed here, see List of boiler explosions. Note, however, that not all boiler explosions are BLEVEs, with some being fuel–air explosions arising in the boiler furnace.

Gas cylinders explosions are listed only where many (typically tens of) canisters exploded in a single event.

== List ==
Date	Country	Location	Fixed or transport	Type	Material (Note: Because different countries have different specifications for liquefied petroleum gas (LPG), sometimes an LPG mixture is referred to as "propane" or "butane" regardless of its composition and at other times pure propane or butane are called LPG. To simplify and obviate the confusion, all accidents involving propane, butane (either n-butane or isobutane), or a mixture thereof are assigned LPG as the representative material.)	Amount (tons)	Fatalities	Fireball	Main article, details and references (Note: References may be omitted if a dedicated article exists, unless data in the table do not appear in the associated article.)
13 December 1926	France	Saint-Auban	F	Storage	Chlorine	25	22	N	
28 May 1928	Germany	Hamburg	F	Storage (runaway reaction)	Phosgene	10	10	N	
10 May 1929	United States	Syracuse, New York	F	Storage	Chlorine	25	1	N	
24 December 1939	Romania	Zărnești	F	Storage	Chlorine	10	60	N	
29 July 1943	Germany	Ludwigshafen	T	Rail	Butadiene (80%) and butene (20%) mixture	16	57	Y	At BASF plant
March 1944	United States	Oklahoma City, Oklahoma	T	Road	LPG	7	5	Y	
5 November 1947	Finland	Rauma	F	Storage	Chlorine	30	19	N	
28 July 1948	Germany	Ludwigshafen	T	Rail	Diethyl ether	33	209	Y	1948 BASF tank car explosion
7 July 1951	United States	Newark, New Jersey	F	Storage	LPG	2600	0	Y	Seventy tanks
4 April 1952	West Germany	Duisburg	F	Storage	Chlorine	30	19	N	
24 June 1952	United States	Kansas City, Missouri	T	Road	LPG		2	Y	
4 January 1954	United States	Atlanta, Georgia	F	Storage	LPG		0	Y	During cargo transfer of a tank truck
13 January 1954	United States	Lakeport, California	F	Storage	LPG		0	Y	During cargo transfer of a tank truck
4 June 1954	United States	Institute, West Virginia	T	Rail	Acrolein	20	0	Y	
19 July 1955	West Germany	Ludwigshafen	T	Road	LPG		0	Y	
29 July 1956	United States	Dumas, Texas	F	Storage	Pentane and hexane mixture	1220	19	Y	McKee refinery tank explosion and fire
22 October 1956	United States	Cottage Grove, Oregon	F	Storage	LPG	< 39	12	Y	At an oil refinery
8 January 1957	Canada	Montreal, Quebec	F	Storage	LPG	5100	1	Y	At Shell refinery. Caused by overfill. Maximum height of flames estimated at 1.5 km.
24 April 1957	United States		F	Process reactor	Formalin and phenol mixture		0	N	At a Factory Mutual research facility. The term "boiling liquid expanding vapor explosion" was coined in the wake of this accident.
24 October 1957	United States	Sacramento, California	T	Road	LPG	18	1	Y	During unloading of a tank truck
1958	United States	Michigan			LPG	55	1	Y	
1958	West Germany	Celle	T	Rail	LPG	25		Y	
4 March 1958	United States	Shattuck, Oklahoma	T	Rail	LPG	150	0	Y	
22 December 1958	United States	Brownfield, Texas	T	Road	LPG	25	4	Y	
22 January 1959	United States	Monroe, Louisiana	T	Rail	Propylene	26	8	Y	
12 March 1959	United States	Brinkley, Arkansas	F	Storage	LPG	< 90	1	Y	Caused by a truck driver starting off without unplugging a transfer hose
28 May 1959	United States	McKittrick, California	F	Storage	LPG		0	Y	
2 June 1959	United States	Deer Lake, Pennsylvania	T	Road	LPG	20	11	Y	
28 June 1959	United States	Meldrim, Georgia	T	Rail	LPG	55	23	Y	Meldrim trestle disaster (Note: No BLEVE occurred according to another source.)
18 August 1959	United States	Kansas City, Missouri	F	Storage	Gasoline	70	5		Along Southwest Boulevard. Kansas City Fire Department's second largest loss of life in the line of duty.
28 March 1960	United Kingdom	Glasgow, Scotland	F	Storage	Whisky	3900 (Note: Total amount of whisky stored. It is unclear how much of it BLEVEd.)	19		Cheapside Street whisky bond fire
17 April 1962	United States	Brandenburg, Kentucky	F	Process reactor (runaway reaction)	Ethylene oxide and ammonia mixture	70	5	Y	
27 May 1962	United States	Berlin, New York	T	Road	LPG	13	10	Y	
12 October 1964	United States	Moran, Kansas	T	Rail	LPG		0	Y	Four tank cars BLEVEd.
13 December 1964	United States	Columbus, Ohio	T	Rail	Ethylene oxide		0	Y	
January 1966	United States	Crawfordville, Georgia	T	Rail	LPG			Y	
4 January 1966	France	Feyzin	F	Storage	LPG	1000	18	Y	Feyzin disaster
28 August 1966	United States	Walton, Kentucky	T	Rail	LPG		0	Y	
22 August 1967	United States	Texarkana, Texas	T	Rail	Butadiene		0	Y	
1 January 1968	United States	Dunreith, Indiana	T	Rail	Ethylene oxide		0	Y	
27 May 1968	United States	Cotulla, Texas	T	Rail	Ethylene oxide		0	Y	
21 August 1968	France	Liévin	T	Road	Ammonia	19	6	N	
27 November 1968	United States	Tarrytown, New York	F	Storage	LPG		0	Y	
January 1969	United States	Geary, Oklahoma	T	Rail	LPG		0	Y	
2 January 1969	Hungary	Répcelak	F	Storage	Carbon dioxide	35	9	N	
25 January 1969	United States	Laurel, Mississippi	T	Rail	LPG	65	2	Y	Several tank cars BLEVEd.
18 February 1969	United States	Crete, Nebraska	T	Rail	Ammonia	65	8	N	
March 1969	United States	Pringle, Texas	T	Rail	LPG			Y	
29 April 1969	United States	Cumming, Iowa	T	Rail	Ammonia	91	0	N	
May 1969	United States	Livingston, Alabama	T	Rail	LPG		0	Y	
2 June 1969	United States	North Carolina	T	Road	LPG		0	Y	
11 September 1969	United States	Glendora, Mississippi	T	Rail	Vinyl chloride	55	0	Y	30,000 people evacuated
21 October 1969	United States	Troup, Texas	T	Rail	Ethylene oxide		0	Y	
8 December 1969	France	Douai	F	HVAC plant	Ammonia	0.3	0		Occurred at a brewery
1970	United States	Hopkinton, Massachusetts	T	Road	LPG	4	0	Y	
30 May 1970	United States	New York City, New York	T	Road	Oxygen	12	2	N	At Victory Memorial Hospital in Brooklyn. Occurred after a liquid oxygen tanker finished unloading a cargo.
21 June 1970	United States	Crescent City, Illinois	T	Rail	LPG	275	0	Y	In downtown area
22 July 1970	France	Perpignan	T	Rail	LPG	45	2	Y	Inside a gas storage and bottling plant
27 August 1970	United States	Byron, New York	T	Rail	Vinyl chloride		0	Y	
23 October 1970	United Kingdom	Hull, England	T	Road	LPG		2	Y	
19 January 1971	United States	Baton Rouge, Louisiana	T	Rail	Ethylene	4	0	Y	
4 February 1971	United States	Eden Prairie, Minnesota	T	Road	LPG	17	0	Y	
19 October 1971	United States	Houston, Texas	T	Rail	Vinyl chloride	50	1	Y	
1972	United States	Montana	F	Storage	LPG		1	Y	
9 February 1972	United States	Tewksbury, Massachusetts	T	Road	LPG	28	3	Y	When unloading at the Lowell Gas Company plant
9 March 1972	United States	Lynchburg, Virginia	T	Road	LPG	9	3	Y	
30 March 1972	Brazil	Duque de Caxias	F	Storage	LPG	1000+	38	Y	1972 Reduc explosion
1 July 1972	Mexico	Jiménez	T	Rail	LPG	65+	10–100	Y	At a marshalling yard
21 September 1972	United States	Hightstown, New Jersey	T	Road	Propylene	18	2	Y	On the New Jersey Turnpike
5 July 1973	United States	Kingman, Arizona	T	Rail	LPG	100	13	Y	Kingman explosion
6 November 1973	United States	Wadstrom,Ventura, California	T	Rail	LPG		3	Y	The accident was caused by two boys releasing the hand brakes of standing tank cars.
17 December 1973	United States	Mountainville, New York	F	Storage	LPG	28	0	Y	
1974	United Kingdom	Aberdeen, Scotland	T	Road	LPG	2	0	Y	
11 January 1974	United States	West St. Paul, Minnesota	F	Storage	LPG	27	4	Y	
12 February 1974	United States	Oneonta, New York	T	Rail	LPG	288	0	Y	
1 March 1974	United States	Londonderry, Pennsylvania	F	Storage	Hydrogen	5		Y	At Three Mile Island Nuclear Generating Station Unit 1. Occurred when firefighters introduced water in a vent stack, plugging it with ice as a result.
17 April 1974	West Germany	Bielefeld	T	Rail	Gasoline		0	Y	Several tank cars exploded.
29 June 1974	United States	Climax, Texas	T	Rail	Vinyl chloride	108	0	Y	
21 September 1974	United States	Houston, Texas	T	Rail	Butadiene	92	1	Y	At a Southern Pacific Transportation Company marshalling yard
14 October 1974	Spain	Benicarló	T	Road	Ethylene	20	0	Y	
29 April 1975	United States	Eagle Pass, Texas	T	Road	LPG	18	16	Y	
22 June 1975	United States	Angleton, Texas	F	Storage	LPG	41	0	Y	
1 September 1975	United States	Saylor, Iowa	T	Rail	LPG		0	Y	Four tank cars BLEVEd.
22 October 1975	United States	Fertile, Minnesota	T	Rail	LPG	75	0	Y	
14 December 1975	United States	Niagara Falls, New York	T	Rail	Chlorine	20	4	N	
11 May 1976	United States	Houston, Texas	T	Road	Ammonia	20	6	N	
19 August 1976	United States	Flint, Michigan	T	Road	LPG	50	1	Y	
31 August 1976	United States	Gadsden, Alabama	F	Storage	Gasoline	4	3	Y	At a gas station
2 September 1976	West Germany	Haltern am See	T	Rail	Carbon dioxide	231	1	N	At a marshalling yard
18 October 1976	United States	Clifford, Michigan	T	Rail	Acrylonitrile		0	Y	
26 November 1976	United States	Belt, Montana	T	Rail	LPG	80	2	Y	
6 February 1977	United States	Boynton Beach, Florida	F/T	Rail Storage	LPG		0	Y	A train laden with propane struck a wall next to four LPG spheres.
20 February 1977	United States	Dallas, Texas	T	Rail	LPG	68	0	Y	
19 June 1977	Mexico	Puebla	F	Storage	Vinyl chloride	110	1	Y	At a plastic factory
12 July 1977	Italy	Cassino	F	Storage	LPG		5	Y	
8 December 1977	Colombia	Cartagena	F	Process reactor	Ammonia	21	30	N	At Abocol urea plant
28 December 1977	United States	Goldonna, Louisiana	T	Rail	LPG	70	2	Y	
31 January 1978	United States	New Martinsville, West Virginia	F	Storage	Nitrogen			N	At an Air Products & Chemicals and Mobay Chemical Corporation facility
24 February 1978	United States	Waverly, Tennessee	T	Rail	LPG	45	16	Y	Waverly tank car explosion
29 March 1978	United States	Lewisville, Arkansas	T	Rail	Vinyl chloride	110	0	Y	
30 May 1978	United States	Texas City, Texas	F	Storage	LPG	1500	7	Y	
June 1978	United States	Whiting, Indiana	T	Rail	Hydrogen		1	Y	At a marshalling yard
11 July 1978	Spain	Alcanar	T	Road	Propylene	25	217	Y	Los Alfaques disaster
4 August 1978	United States	Donnellson, Iowa	T	Pipeline	LPG	435	2	Y	
22 November 1978	United States	Canyon, Texas	T	Rail	LPG		0	Y	
18 December 1978	The Netherlands	Nijmegen	T	Road	LPG	17	0	Y	At a gas station. A fixed LPG tank was also exposed but did not explode.
8 April 1979	United States	Crestview, Florida	T	Rail	Ammonia		0	N	
10 June 1979	United States	Verdigris, Oklahoma	T	Rail	Ammonia	75	2	N	Occurred when unloading a tank car at the Agrico plant
30 August 1979	United States	Good Hope, Louisiana	T	Shipping	LPG	120	12	Y	Collision between MV Inca Tupac Yupanqui and butane-laden barge TB Panama City (Note: No BLEVE occurred according to another source.)
8 September 1979	United States	Paxton, Shelby County, Texas	T	Rail	Tetrahydrofuran and ethylene oxide		0	Y	Derailment of 33 tank cars and two locomotives
10 November 1979	Canada	Mississauga, Ontario	T	Rail	LPG	21	0	Y	Three tank cars explode
8 January 1980	The Netherlands	Berg en Dal	T	Shipping			0		Collision between vessels Kombi 21 and Rodort 6 on the river Waal by the hamlet of Erlecom
3 March 1980	United States	Los Angeles, California	T	Road	Gasoline	36	5	Y	
1 August 1981	Mexico	Cerritos, San Luis Potosí	T	Rail	Chlorine	110	29	N	
21 June 1982	The Netherlands	Grootebroek	F	Storage			1		
26 June 1982	Canada	Lundbreck, Alberta	T	Rail	LPG		0	Y	
July 1982	United Kingdom	Tyne and Wear, England			LPG	~2	0	Y	Two 1-ton tanks exploded
28 September 1982	United States	Livingston, Louisiana	T	Rail	Vinyl chloride and styrene	640	0	Y	
11 December 1982	United States	Taft, Louisiana	F	Storage (runaway reaction)	Acrolein	250	0	Y	More than 20,000 evacuated
29 December 1982	Italy	Florence	T	Road	LPG		4	Y	
12 July 1983	United States	Reserve, Louisiana	F	Process vessel (runaway reaction)	Chloroprene	1	3		
3 September 1983	United States	Murdock, Illinois	T	Rail	LPG		0	Y	
4 October 1983	United States	Houston, Texas	F	Storage	Methyl bromide	28	2	N	
January 1984	United Kingdom	Cleveland, England	F	Storage	LPG	1	0	Y	
23 July 1984	United States	Romeoville, Illinois	F	Process vessel	LPG		15	Y	1984 Romeoville petroleum refinery disaster
19 November 1984	Mexico	San Juan Ixhuatepec	F	Storage	LPG	3000	500+	Y	San Juanico disaster
19 May 1985	Italy	Priolo Gargallo	F	Storage	LPG	50	0	Y	At Enichem petrochemical plant. The BLEVE was caused by a jet fire from the broken pipe of a distillation column.
9 June 1985	United States	Pine Bluff, Arkansas	T	Rail	Ethylene oxide		0	Y	
28 January 1986	United States	Merritt Island, Florida	T	Spacecraft	Hydrogen and oxygen		7	Y	Space Shuttle Challenger disaster
1987	United States	Minnesota	F	Storage	LPG		0	Y	Three propane tanks BLEVEd at a research facility.
17 August 1987	Australia	Cairns, Queensland	F	Storage	LPG	20	1	Y	
21 March 1988	United Kingdom	Kings Ripton, England	F	Storage	LPG		0	Y	Storage tank for domestic use
16 August 1988	Italy	Spinetta Marengo	F	Process vessel (runaway reaction)	Diisopropyl monohydroperoxide		0	Y	Uncontrolled thermal decomposition of Luperox DH at Atofina plant
21 November 1988	West Germany	Worms	F	Storage	Carbon dioxide	66	3	N	
23 December 1988	United States	Memphis, Tennessee	T	Road	LPG	18	9	Y	Memphis tank truck disaster
20 May 1989	Soviet Union	Alma Ata	T	Rail	LPG	23	20+	Y	Following a train collision
1 April 1990	Australia	Sydney, New South Wales	F	Storage	LPG	240+	0	Y	Occurred at Boral's St. Peters facility. Fire broke out at about 9:00 pm, burning for over nine hours. A 100-ton tank and many smaller ones exploded.
28 August 1992	Japan	Ishikari	F	Storage	Nitrogen	4	0	N	
27 June 1993	Canada	Warwick, Quebec	F	Storage	LPG	2	4	Y	Occurred in a barn serving as maternity for calves
August 1993	India	Panipat	F	Process vessel	Ammonia		6	N	
4 March 1994	United States	Weyauwega, Wisconsin	T	Rail	LPG		0	Y	Weyauwega, Wisconsin, derailment
15 March 1996	Italy	Paese	T	Road	LPG	13	2	Y	The fire initiated when a tank truck was offloading cargo.
18 March 1996	Italy	Capaci	T	Road	LPG		5	Y	
1 December 1996	Argentina	La Plata	F	Pipes	LPG		2	Y	
29 April 1997	Turkey	Pendik	F	Storage	LPG	10	0	Y	At a factory for packaging of aerosol containers
2 October 1997	United States	Burnside, Illinois	F	Storage	LPG	2	2	Y	Near a grain dryer
1998	China	Xi'an	F	Storage	LPG		11	Y	
9 April 1998	United States	Albert City, Iowa	F	Storage	LPG	34	2	Y	At Herrig Brothers turkey farm
22 March 1999	Turkey	Dortyrol	F	Storage	LPG	~30	2	Y	
1 May 1999	Greece	Kamena Vourla	T	Road	LPG	18	4	Y	
23 September 1999	Canada	Toronto, Ontario	T	Rail	LPG	60+	0	Y	
30 December 1999	Canada	Mont-Saint-Hilaire, Quebec	T	Rail	Gasoline		4	Y	
22 March 2000	Morocco	Casablanca	T	Road	LPG		0	Y	A tank truck exploded at an offloading station. The fire engulfed two fixed tanks but cooling by firemen and relief valves prevented further BLEVEs.
9 May 2000	France	Bordes	T	Road	LPG	10	0	Y	Several gas canisters on board a truck
27 May 2000	United States	Eunice, Louisiana	T	Rail	Methyl chloride		0	Y	
19 July 2000	United States	Willoughby, Ohio	F	Storage	LPG	66	0	Y	AmeriGas plant, overfilled propane cylinders. Later the company recalled other cylinders it has sold to prevent further accidents.
20 October 2000	United States	Downey, California	F	Storage	LPG	2	0	Y	
22 October 2000	United States	Texas	T		LPG	17	2	Y	
25 December 2000	United States	Douglas (Note: The source does not specify which of the many places with this name in the US.)	F	Storage	LPG	~1	0	Y	
7 January 2001	India	Kanpur	T	Road	LPG		12	Y	
7 January 2001	United States	Truth or Consequences, New Mexico	F/T	Storage Road	LPG	37	0	Y	One fixed tank exploded after a collision from a truck. A 2,000 U.S. gal (7.6 m^{3}) truck tank later also exploded.
1 July 2001	India	Jamnagar			LPG		12	Y	
14 July 2001	United States	Riverview, Michigan	T	Rail	Methyl mercaptan	71	3	Y	Within an Atofina chemical plant
23 November 2001	Canada	Sainte-Sophie, Quebec	F	Storage	LPG	~10	0	Y	
22 June 2002	Spain	Tivissa	T	Road	LNG	22	1	Y	First ever reported LNG BLEVE
28 July 2002	Turkey	İzmit	T	Road	LPG	63	1	Y	At a gas bottling station
14 March 2003	United States	Newton, New Jersey	T	Road	LPG		0	Y	At Able Energy tank farm. Unconfirmed BLEVE of an LPG tanker in the parking lot.
5 July 2003	Turkey	Ankara	F	Storage	LPG	6	3+	Y	At a petrol station
12 November 2003	France	Razines	F	Storage	LPG	1+	0	Y	
18 November 2003	France	La Roche-Bernard	T	Road	LPG		2	Y	
9 June 2005	France	Saint-Laurent-Blangy	T	Road	LPG				A train collided with a truck at a rail crossing. Several canisters carried by the truck exploded. The first car of the train was completely charred.
24 June 2005	United States	St. Louis, Missouri	F	Storage	Acetylene, carbon dioxide, helium, hydrogen, LPG, oxygen, propylene, etc.		1	Y	At a Praxair gas cylinder filling plant. Dozens of cylinders BLEVEd.
1 April 2006	France	Audincourt	F	Storage	LPG				65 gas canisters exploded.
5 October 2006	United States	Apex, North Carolina	F	Storage	Flammable solvents and paints		0	Y	Several 200-L drums BLEVEd when engulfed in fire.
7 May 2007	France	Dagneux	T	Road	LPG	3	0	Y	Two or three BLEVEs in a parking lot
10 August 2008	Canada	Toronto, Ontario	F	Storage	LPG		2	Y	Toronto propane explosion. Several BLEVEs.
2 October 2008	United States	St. Paul, Minnesota	T	Road			0	Y	On I-94
13 November 2008	China	Yuhang, Hangzhou	T	Shipping	Carbon dioxide	72	2	N	
27 July 2010	France	Port-la-Nouvelle	T	Road	LPG	4	0	Y	Tank truck in the parking lot of a gas-bottling factory
11 March 2011	Japan	Chiba	F	Storage	LPG		0	Y	Occurred at a Cosmo refinery. Caused by 2011 Tōhoku earthquake. Several LPG tanks involved.
11 March 2011	Japan	Sendai	F	Storage	LPG			Y	Occurred at a JX oil refinery. Caused by 2011 Tōhoku earthquake. Several LPG tanks involved.
20 October 2011	Spain	Zarzalico	T	Road	LNG	22	1	Y	Fatality caused by collision
27 August 2012	India	Chala	T	Road	LPG	18	20	Y	Chala LPG tanker disaster
29 September 2012	Japan	Himeji	F	Process vessel (runaway reaction)	Acrylic acid	26	1	Y	At Nippon Shokubai chemical plant
7 May 2013	Mexico	Ecatepec de Morelos, Mexico	T	Road	LPG	19	22	Y	
13 June 2013	United States	Geismar, Louisiana	F	Process vessel	LPG	9	2	Y	Williams Olefins Plant explosion
13 July 2013	Russia	Moscow	T	Road	LPG	1	0	Y	Dozens of LPG canisters
29 July 2013	United States	Tavares, Florida	F	Storage	LPG		0	Y	At a gas bottling plant. Thousands of 9 kg (20 lb) canisters BLEVEd.
30 December 2013	United States	Casselton, North Dakota	T	Rail	Bakken crude oil	1500	0	Y	
21 July 2014	Turkey	Lice	T	Road	LPG	19	34	Y	
6 April 2015	China	Zhangzhou	F	Storage	Crude oil			Y	Dragon Aromatics explosions. The first blast was heard 50 km (31 mi) away. A conflagration ensued.
8 April 2015	China	Zhangzhou	F	Storage	Crude oil	1500		Y	Caused by the fire that started two days earlier
3 April 2016	France	Bassens	T	Road	LPG		0	Y	In the parking lot of a hazardous cargo transport company. Two BLEVEs.
3 April 2017	United States	St. Louis, Missouri	F	Steam plant	Water		4	N	At Loy-Lange Box Company
18 September 2017	France	Chevanceux	T	Road	LPG		0	Y	Several LPG cylinders BLEVEd.
5 June 2018	United States	Sonoma, California	F	Storage	LPG	2	0	Y	At a lumber and pallet factory
6 August 2018	Italy	Bologna	T	Road	LPG	23	2	Y	Borgo Panigale explosion
21 June 2019	United States	Philadelphia, Pennsylvania	F	Process vessel	Butene, isobutane and n-butane mixture		0	Y	2019 Philadelphia refinery explosion. BLEVE was the third of three major explosions.
13 June 2020	China	Wenling	T	Road	LPG	25	20	N	The gas did not ignite upon loss of containment. Later ignition resulted in a vapor cloud explosion.
24 December 2022	South Africa	Boksburg	T	Road	LPG	33	41	Y	Boksburg explosion
20 January 2023	France	Fillinges	T	Road	LPG		0	Y	
22 March 2023	United States	Pasadena, Texas	T	Road	LPG		0	Y	During tank truck offloading at INEOS Phenol Cumene plant
3 July 2024	Brazil	Paragominas	T	Road	LPG		0	Y	
4 July 2025	Italy	Rome	T	Road	LPG		1	Y	During offloading of a tank truck at a gas station
23 December 2025	Italy	Teano	T	Road	LPG		0	Y	Tank truck parked at a service area on the A1 highway
19 February 2026	Chile	Renca	T	Road	LPG	25	11	N (Note: The release was ignited after considerable expansion of the gas. This resulted in a flash fire rather than a fireball.)	

== See also ==
- List of explosions
  - List of boiler explosions
  - List of tanker explosions
- Lists of rail accidents
  - List of American railroad accidents
