= San Juanico disaster =

1984 industrial accident near Mexico City, Mexico

Coordinates: 19°31′26.7″N 99°06′27.8″W

- Aerial view of the terminal after the accident, with the two surviving Horton sphere tanks in the top center. In the foreground, part of the destroyed residential area.

- San Juanico disaster (State of Mexico)
- Date: 19 November 1984
- Time: 5:30-11:00 a.m. (Central Time Zone)
- Venue: Pemex San Juanico Liquefied petroleum gas Terminal
- Location: San Juan Ixhuatepec, Tlalnepantla de Baz municipality, State of Mexico, Mexico
- Type: Multiple boiling liquid expanding vapor explosions and fire
- Cause: Ignition of LPG vapor leak from ruptured pipeline
- Deaths: 500+ (Note: Official data report 503 deaths. Unofficial sources cite up to 2000 fatalities)
- Injuries: 5,000–7,000

The San Juanico disaster was a series of deadly fires and explosions that occurred at a Pemex-owned liquefied petroleum gas (LPG) terminal on 19 November 1984, in San Juan Ixhuatepec, a town of Tlalnepantla de Baz, within the State of Mexico, Mexico. The fires and explosions were caused by the rupturing of a pipeline within the facility, which released vaporized LPG that ignited and damaged several storage tanks.

The terminal and surrounding town were destroyed by the damage, and at least 503 people were killed, with another 5,000 to 7,000 suffering a range of injuries.

It is one of the deadliest industrial disasters in history, and the deadliest industrial accident involving fires and/or explosions from hazardous materials in a process or storage plant since the Oppau explosion in 1921.

== Background ==
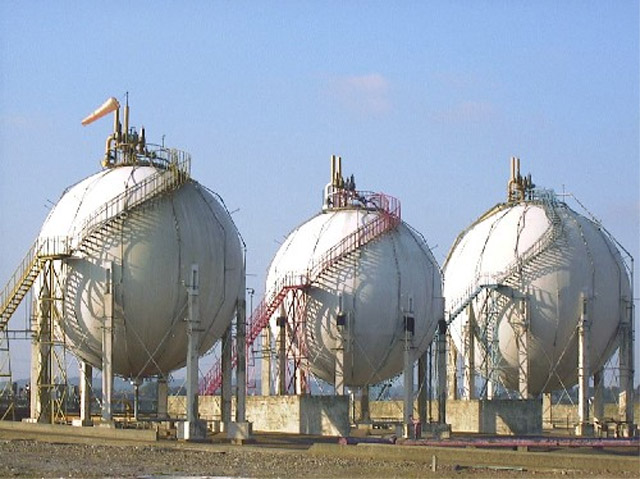
Horton sphere tanks holding liquified gas, similar to the six spherical tanks at the San Juanico terminal

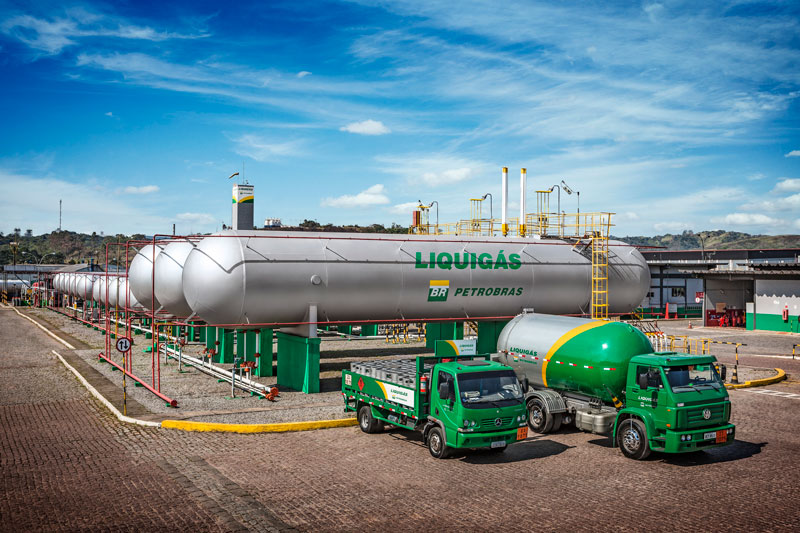
Petrobras bullet tank field. Note how this modern installation’s layout is well-ventilated and spread out over the ground; this configuration minimizes damage and missile risk during BLEVEs.

The terminal, locally named San Juanico, was a storage and distribution terminal for liquified petroleum gas (LPG), owned and operated by the Mexican state-owned oil company Pemex. The terminal mostly stored propane and butane products, and received its LPG from other Pemex facilities across southern Mexico through three underground pipelines:

- a 12-inch (305 mm) pipeline from the Lazaro Cardenas Refinery in Minatitlán, Veracruz (about 576 km (358 mi) away),
- a 4-inch (102 mm) diameter pipeline from the Poza Rica Gas Complex in Veracruz (about 235 km (146 mi) away), and
- another 4-inch (102 mm) line from the Azcapotzalco Refinery in Mexico City (about 8 km (5 mi) away).

=== Terminal capacity and configuration ===
The terminal’s gas capacity consisted of 54 storage tanks for the LPG: six large Horton sphere tanks and 48 smaller, horizontal bullet tanks of various sizes. Four of the six Horton tanks had a capacity of 1,600 cubic metres (57,000 cu ft), which the other two had a capacity of 2,400 cubic metres (85,000 cu ft).

These tanks gave the facility a total capacity of 16,000 cubic metres (570,000 cu ft), representing one-third of Mexico City's entire LPG supply. Tanks were divided into several clusters by concrete walls about 1 metre (3.3 ft) tall. The bullet tanks were arranged in a stacked tower configuration.

The facility also had two ground flare pits and a fire protection system which included a reserve pond, fire pumps, and firewater spray distribution system.

=== Surrounding facilities and town ===
Neighboring the San Juanico terminal to the east was a Unigas facility with additional LPG storage and distribution capacity, and a Gasomático gas-bottling and distribution facility, where residential gas bottles were distributed by truck. The San Juanico terminal distributed LPG to these two facilities directly via underground pipelines. Five more gas distribution companies in the surrounding area obtained gas from the San Juanico terminal through truck shipments.

The town of San Juan Ixhuatepec surrounded the terminal and had a population of about 40,000 residents, with an additional 60,000 more living in nearby communities. (Note: According to another source, the official census recorded 45,000 residents in San Juanico, with an additional floating population of 25,000; however, figures published in 1984 were in disagreement, with some stating 50,000 residents and others as many as 500,000.) The settlement of San Juan Ixhuatepec existed before the facility was built, but housing immediately surrounding the facility itself began only after the construction of the terminal began in 1962, although this is disputed. Houses were built as close as 130 metres (430 ft) away from the LPG storage tanks, and most of the houses in the area were simple brick or wooden buildings. At least two sphere tanks were added to the plant when it was already surrounded by the densely populated neighborhood.

=== Previous safety concerns ===
The plant was said to have been built in conformance to API standards, but this was later questioned by investigators. In the two months leading up to the disaster, inspections for the local plant safety committee revealed multiple issues with several of the facility’s mechanical and passive safety systems:

- Between 30 and 40% of safety devices, including the firewater spray system, were being bypassed or were non-operational;
- housekeeping was substandard;
- Multiple pressure gauges were physically defective and inaccurate;
- a relief valve on one of the manifolds for an LPG-receiving pipe was missing; and
- the support legs of the Horton sphere tanks lacked fireproofing.

It was also found that an additional relief valve would be needed for the Minatitlán pipeline, after the pipeline’s operational flow rate had been increased up to 11,900 cubic meters per day (about 75,000 barrels of productivity per day).

== Accident ==
=== Site filling and initial leak ===
In the early hours of 19 November 1984, the San Juanico facility was being filled with LPG from the Minatitlán refinery’s pipeline, as the terminal’s tanks had been almost empty since the day prior. By 5:30 a.m. CST, two of the Horton tanks and all 48 of the bullet tanks were filled up to 90% capacity, while the rest of the Horton sphere tanks were at 50%; at this point, the plant held between 11,000–12,000 cubic metres (390,000–420,000 cu ft) of LPG, around 70% of the plant’s total capacity and with an energy equivalent over 300 TJ, roughly five times the energy released by the Little Boy atomic bomb.

At around 5:30 a.m., a 20 cm diameter pipe between a Horton tank and the bullet tanks ruptured, releasing vaporized LPG into the air. Control room operators at both San Juanico and the pipeline pumping station 40 kilometres (25 miles) upstream noticed a substantial pressure drop in the pipeline, but neither set of operators could identify the cause or source of the leak for 5 to 10 minutes after the initial pressure drop. As the gas cloud continued to build up inside the terminal, it reached an estimated maximum volume of 66,000 cubic metres (2,263,800 ft^{3}).

=== Fire and explosions ===
At 5:45 a.m, the vapor cloud eventually reached one of the waste-gas flare pits and ignited. A flash fire ensued, which immediately transitioned to a violent vapor cloud explosion (VCE), likely due to its flame front’s acceleration being funneled by the congested geometry of the plant. The blast was felt and recorded by a seismometer at a National Autonomous University of Mexico (UNAM) laboratory located 32 km (20 mi) away, in Mexico City. The initial VCE created a domino effect accident, where damage from the VCE cause other pipes and storage tanks to leak, causing a massive conflagration that damaged other storage tanks, priming them to explode as well.

About 90 seconds after the VCE blast, at 5:46 a.m, the first boiling liquid expanding vapor explosion (BLEVE) occurred in one of the tanks. The explosion was reportedly visible throughout Mexico City, and the pilot of a Pan Am flight on approach to Mexico City International Airport who managed to see the explosion communicated to air traffic control that he believed a nuclear bomb may have exploded in the city. Eight more BLEVEs would occur for the next two hours, as each explosion damaged more tanks in the terminal and adjoining gas facilities; each BLEVE was recorded by the UNAM seismometer, with the last one recorded at 7:01 a.m.

The first and sixth BLEVEs are believed to have been the most violent explosions, with both registering a peak of 0.5 on the Richter scale. The BLEVE fireballs were up to 300 metres (980 ft) in diameter, and had a duration of some 20 seconds. Smaller explosions continued at the terminal and surrounding facilities until 11 a.m., when the flames on the last Horton sphere tank was extinguished.

== Emergency response ==
The first call to the emergency services was made at 5:45, immediately after the VCE. More than 200 firefighters were deployed to the affected area in the first six hours after the first explosion. Water for firefighting was provided to the site by tank trucks normally used for domestic portable water distribution. After the last BLEVE at 7:01, firefighters prioritized cooling the two larger, intact Horton sphere tanks in order to avoid additional explosions. A major rescue operation was declared, and the majority of rescue operations occurred between 8:00 and 10:00 a.m. Around 4,000 people, including 985 medics, 1780 paramedics, and 1332 volunteers, participated in rescue and medical activities. 363 ambulances and five helicopters were involved. As many as 200,000 people were evacuated from the area. The Mexico City Metro system and public buses were commandeered to transport the wounded to hospitals and the evacuees to evacuation centers.

== Casualties and damage ==
=== Death toll and injuries ===
The Mexican government would put the official death toll of the disaster at 503, although some reports claimed between 500 to 600 deaths, and other unofficial sources cite up to 2,000 fatalities. Between 5,000 and 7,000 injuries were recorded. Five workers at the San Juanico terminal were killed in the disaster, while the overwhelming majority of the victims were residents living in the housing area surrounding the plant, mostly in buildings within 300 metres (980 ft) of the LPG storage tank area. Most of the casualties were killed in their sleep by the initial explosions.

The heat and fire generated by explosions incinerated most of the victims’ corpses, with only 16 (2%) of the recovered remains left in recognizable condition and which contributed to uncertainty in the death toll. The American Institute of Chemical Engineers (AIChE) estimated that the thermal radiation produced by the BLEVEs exceeded the threshold of pain, 4.0 kW/m^{2}, within a radius of 1,850 metres (1.15 mi) of the accident site.

=== Property damage ===
The San Juanico terminal was almost entirely destroyed by the disaster. The four smaller Horton sphere tanks were completely destroyed, with fragments propelled up to 350 metres (1,150 ft) away from the facility, into residential areas. The two larger Horton sphere tanks remained intact, but has collapsed onto the ground as their support legs has weakened and buckled under the intense heat of the fires. Only four of the 48 bullet tanks were found intact after the fire. 12 of the tanks that had exploded were launched from their supports and become missiles, with the furthest landing 1,200 metres (3,900 ft) off-site; the total weight of the fragments of these tanks weighed up to 30 metric tons.

Several secondary gas explosions occurred inside the neighboring plant buildings and surrounding houses. At the Gasomático site, 100 parked trucks loaded with household gas cylinders weighing 20–40 kilograms (44–88 lb) each were completely burned out, with hundreds of secondary explosions taking place.

An area of several square kilometers was affected, with varying degrees of damage from the fires and projectile tanks. Around 150 homes were completely destroyed, with a few hundred sustaining other levels of damage.

== Investigation ==
=== Mexican government investigation ===
Initially, Director-General of Pemex Mario Ramón Beteta and other government officials attempted to shift responsibility for the accident onto the gas-distributing businesses adjoining the terminal, as well as blaming the people of San Juan Ixhuatepec for settling next to the gas plant. No results from a public inquiry or a Pemex investigation have ever been made available, except for a declaration of the Attorney General released on 22 December 1984, which identified the origin of the initial gas release as having occurred in the row of bullet tanks next to the Horton sphere tanks. In this press release, it was also stated that the responsibilities were not to be sought in the lack of plant maintenance. The Attorney General ultimately found Pemex responsible for the disaster, and ordered the company to provide the funds necessary for the Mexican Government to pay for indemnifications. The Mexican Petroleum Institute (IMP), who provides training for Pemex employees, stated that the cause of the accident was a disgruntled employee that had allegedly sabotaged the plant. The IMP also added that further investigation would not necessarily be useful.

=== TNO investigation ===
Through an internal initiative and mediation of the local Dutch embassy, a team of the Netherlands Organisation for Applied Scientific Research (TNO) reached the former terminal site two weeks after the accident. This investigation was not to determine the cause of the accident and was not assisted by Mexican authorities or Pemex, rather it was a scientific mission whose purpose was to test physical models used in safety studies for the prediction of damage from industrial explosions and examining the emergency response to the accident. The investigation was accompanied by the IMP.

The TNO report was issued in May of 1985. Although the Dutch team did not primarily focus on the cause of the accident, the final report hypothesizes that the initial leak may have been caused by an overpressure of a pipe to one of the bullet tanks, possibly due to the high discharge pressure (> 60 bars (870 psi)) of a booster pump in one of the underground pipelines. This overpressure, likely combined with the tank overfilling and the opening of its relief valve, ruptured the pipe and discharged LPG vapor to atmosphere.

The report iterated that the majority of the destruction in the disaster was caused by the fires that engulfed the terminal, with overpressure from the explosions only playing a secondary role. TNO criticized the dense, congested plant layout as a factor that greatly contributed to the rapid escalation of the accident, as well as poor land-use planning which led to housing built within the credible damage radius for the plant. It also commends the work of the emergency services.

=== USDOT/PHMSA investigation ===
An informal investigation was conducted by the Pipeline and Hazardous Materials Safety Administration (PHMSA) of the United States Department of Transportation (USDOT), which corroborated the findings from the TNO report on the cause of the accident, additionally pointing out that the overpressure event should have been prevented by relief valves placed on the receiving pipelines, which had not been installed.

Their report also called attention to an earlier statement made by Pemex, in which they claimed that the pipelines refilling the terminal were not shut down or isolated during the accident, with LPG being pumped into the terminal at the usual rate until 6:40 a.m., the accident. This further aggravated the fire, with an estimated additional fuel inventory of roughly 500 cubic meters (18,000 cu ft). The USDOT concluded that the main causal factors were "the human element, maintenance problems, and inadequate relief capacity and pressure control." They also identified two more contributing factors: multiple tanks being lined up (i.e., not isolated from) a common header, which increased the effectiveness of the chain reaction; and the failure of piping underneath the spheres as a consequence of the initial vapor cloud explosion, which meant that the consequent tank heating ultimately escalated to the BLEVEs.

=== KAMEDO investigation ===
A team from the Katastrofmedicinska organisationskommittén (English: Disaster Medicine Organization Committee) of the Swedish National Defence Research Institute, also known as KAMEDO, were sent to Mexico for an post-evaluation of the medical emergency management during the disaster. Members of the team were experienced in BLEVE accidents, having already conducted a similar onsite inquiry in the aftermath of the 1978 Los Alfaques disaster. The KAMEDO report found that the first responders’ actions for treating burns and other injuries had been effective, and that the responders were supported by considerable local medical resources and prior experience.

== Aftermath ==
"SHOCK": The November 21 cover of La Prensa

=== Burying of the dead ===
The dead were hastily buried on 20 and 21 November. Only 16 of the recovered remains could be identified, with the rest buried in a common grave in the cemetery of the Caracoles neighborhood of Tlalnepantla. President of Mexico Miguel de la Madrid and other high-ranking government officials drew criticism for not attending either the funeral ceremony or the mass burial of the victims.

=== Accusations of cover-up ===
Some sources point to Pemex officials and public authorities potentially hampering the relief and investigation efforts. Rumors spread that the priest of the San Juan Ixhuatepec parish may have been removed and relocated to somewhere else in the State of Mexico by church authorities, after he complained that much of the financial aid allocated to the affected families was quickly disappearing. In a speech in Guadalajara, Director-General Ramón Beteta likened criticism directed at the company to cannibalism, declaring that Pemex's tax money was key in keeping Mexico afloat.

=== Repayment and indemnities ===
Six weeks after the disaster, with no official investigation results, the government started payment of indemnifications to those affected by the disaster "at a flat rate", without considering the different situations of the victims including ages, family structure, and employment conditions. The federal government paid the equivalent of US$10,400 per fatality, while the Mexican State government gave 167 families new homes in the Valle de Anáhuac neighborhood, each being valued at around US$8,000.

=== Responsibility of disaster ===
Concerns about the uncontrolled growth of the housing areas immediately adjoining the San Juanico terminal were raised prior to the disaster. It was found that the terminal had violated the 1970 amendments to Article 8 of the 1950 Liquid Gas Distribution Act, which establishing rules setting minimum safety distances to LPG facilities and mandating approvals from the Secretariat of Health and Assistance to permit facility operation. While the government made an official communication announcing that all gas plants in San Juan Ixhuatepec should be shut down soon after the disaster, six out of twelve facilities in the town were still in operation as of 2020.

The disaster was detrimental to the ruling Institutional Revolutionary Party (PRI); with official reports notwithstanding, the Mexican public generally blamed the PRI’s leadership for inadequately-maintained Pemex infrastructure. These criticisms were later subsumed by criticism of the federal government’s response to the 1985 Mexico City earthquake less than a year later. In the years following the accident, the government's actions (or lack thereof) were criticized in several respects.

=== Demolishing, new facility, and future accidents ===
The San Juanico terminal was shut down, and the tank storage area was demolished. The demolished area, which also included where most of the destroyed houses used to be, was then turned into Cri Cri Park. Hidalgo Park was built south of Cri Cri Park, and features a large metal cross as a memorial to the victims.

The Terminal de Almacenamiento y Despache Satélite Norte (English: Storage and Distribution Terminal, North Satellite Site), also known as TAD Satélite Norte, was built about one kilometer northeast of the San Juanico site and serves as a Pemex liquid fuel distribution terminal.

On 23 November, 1990, a valve on a Pemex gas pipeline exploded in San Juan Ixhuatepec, requiring residents to evacuate; no injuries were reported. On 11 November, 1996, a gasoline fire erupted at TAD Satélite Norte after leaded gasoline leaked from a faulty valve in a storage tank; 4 people were killed and around 55 others were injured.

== Legacy ==
Although the accident became well-known worldwide in the technical domain of process safety, it had relatively little mainstream news attention outside of Mexico, likely due to the fact that no non-Mexican companies were involved, and possibly overshadowed by the Bhopal disaster which occurred two weeks later on December 3.

=== Legacy in process safety ===
San Juanico had a notable impact on process safety. TNO's contributions were used by the American Petroleum Institute (API) to support their standards in the 2001 Standard 2510, Design and Construction of LPG Installations and Fire Considerations of the same standard. Many of the lessons recorded in forensic reviews of the disaster, accompanied by hazard and operability analysis (HAZOP) and functional safety reviews, are now standard procedure for gas storage systems. Management of change is nowadays a key element of process safety management systems, like the one promulgated by OSHA in 1992, which recognize that changes that are not thoroughly risk-assessed and communicated can and do lead to serious accidents.

Among the safety lessons and flaws that were reviewed as a result of the disaster included:

- The discovery that the San Juanico terminal had not undergone a HAZOP study prior to, or during, operation; the failure to do a study of the terminal’s design allowed engineers to overlook critical design flaws throughout the terminal’s facility layout and mechanical systems;
- Lack of design safety analysis allowed a design flaw in the tank-filling pipelines to persist, which allowed the LPG booster pump to over-pressurize the gas tanks if it overfilled, as none of the components or pipes in the filling pipeline were fitted with relief devices to cope with the increasing pressure;
  - The same lack of design safety analysis also allowed engineers to overlook the addition of am automatic tank overfill protection system, meaning that incoming LPG flow was not automatically stopped when tanks overfilled or experienced high pressure.
- Gas plant layout design should be based on inherent safety principles, in order to minimize confounding and escalation effects;
  - A significant factor contributing to the intensity of the initial VCE was the terminal’s crowded geometry, caused by tight clustering of the bullet tanks and exacerbated by the relatively tall 1 metre bund walls. The congested layout of the facility limited the dispersion of the LPG vapor cloud, which allowed it to concentrate above its Lower Explosion Limit (LEL) and ignite in a flash fire. The crowded geometry then compressed the flash fire between its narrow passageways, accelerating the flame front and resulting in a violent vapor cloud explosion.
  - The bullet tanks in San Juanico were grouped in crowded parallel stacks, meaning that in the case that any of them experienced a BLEVE, fragments of the tank could strike several of the other bullet tanks surrounding the exploding tank simultaneously at close range.
  - The bullet tanks were also arranged without regard for missile trajectory in the case of failure, meaning that explosions with the bullet tanks carried the additional risk that the tank could launch itself towards other critical parts of the facility or residential areas.
- Key change management processes were not applied when modifications to the terminal’s operation were made; the recently increased flow rate from the Minatitlán pipeline would have warranted improved pressure relief arrangements that were never added, and additional capacity (two Horton tanks) was added without assessing the need for correct tank spacing.
- The plant did not have an effective gas detection system, which prevented early detection of the leak and a pipeline shutdown that contributing to the vapor cloud growing significantly large.
- Emergency isolation measures were lacking at the facility. Many of the facility’s systems lacked isolation valves between tank groupings, despite the contiguity of large inventories. This lack of flow separation, as well as the failure to shut down the leaking pipeline earlier, greatly contributed to the escalation of the accident due to the operators’ inability to restrict LPG flow from both the leaking pipeline and other tanks in the system, feeding the vapor cloud and subsequent fire.
- The lack of fireproofing or application of suitable passive fire protection on the support legs of the Horton sphere tanks may have contributed to the BLEVEs of the smaller sphere tanks; the TNO report theorizes that heat and damage of the fires and explosions weakened the structural steel legs, which caused the tanks to collapse and trigger tank wall failure through impact with the ground or with other tanks.
- The firewater and tank cooling distribution systems were inadequate for the facility. Apart from being partially inoperable due to poor maintenance and system bypassing, the systems had very low spray rate, much lower than the minimum of 10 liter/minute/square meter (0.25 gal/min/ft^{2}) advised in API 2510A for LPG tanks, where "there is concern or risk of a vessel being fully engulfed by flame because of its location, piping configuration, or impounding or drainage design."
  - Effectiveness of the firewater distribution system was outright negated during the disaster, as the firewater distribution system at San Juanico failed; the firewater main line, which was installed aboveground, ruptured and was destroyed during the initial explosions.
- Responding firefighters did not know the full scale of the terminal’s capacity or BLEVE risk during the accident, and unnecessarily exposed themselves to immense danger when trying to cool the unexploded Horton sphere tanks. It is important that emergency services be aware of the dangers of liquefied gas vessels exposed to impinging fires.
- Land-use planning had minimal enforcement when the facility was built and expanded. There was little evident of robust risk assessments and accident models having been done. Only after forensic review of the facility were safety distances of 300 metres (980 ft) between an LPG plant the size of San Juanico's and residential areas proposed.

The San Juanico tragedy, which followed other destructive BLEVE events such as those of Feyzin and Los Alfaques, resulted in higher awareness of the destructive potential of BLEVEs and the necessity to manage effectively the risk associated to these phenomena.

=== Later accident ===
In 1996 another Pemex site in San Juan Ixhuatepec suffered a serious accident, this time involving a petrol tank, which led to the death of a fireman and the evacuation of around 5000 people from their homes.

== See also ==
Other notable BLEVE accidents:

- Feyzin disaster (France, 1966)
- Kingman explosion (Arizona, 1973)
- Los Alfaques disaster (Spain, 1978)
- Waverly tank car explosion (Tennessee, 1978)
- Memphis tanker truck disaster (Tennessee, 1988)
