= Pablo G. Debenedetti =

Argentine scientist

- Born: March 30, 1953 (age 73); Buenos Aires, Argentina
- Education: University of Buenos Aires, Massachusetts Institute of Technology
- Scientific career
- Fields: Thermodynamics, Statistical Mechanics, Molecular Simulation, Chemical Engineering
- Workplaces: Princeton University
- Doctoral advisor: Robert Reid

Pablo G. Debenedetti is an American and Argentine chemical engineer. He is the Class of 1950 Professor in Engineering and Applied Science, Emeritus, and a professor of chemical and biological engineering, emeritus, at Princeton University. He served as Princeton's Dean for Research from 2013 to 2023. His research focuses on thermodynamics, statistical mechanics, and computer simulations of liquids and glasses.

Debenedetti was elected a member of the National Academy of Engineering in 2000, the American Academy of Arts and Sciences in 2008, and the National Academy of Sciences in 2012.

== Early life and education ==
Debenedetti was born in Buenos Aires, Argentina, in 1953. He graduated from the University of Buenos Aires in 1978 with a degree in chemical engineering, and worked as a process development engineer at the De Nora Company in Milan, Italy, between 1978 and 1980. He completed his master's degree in 1981 and his Ph.D. in 1985, both in chemical engineering, at the Massachusetts Institute of Technology, where his thesis adviser was Robert C. Reid. He joined the faculty of Princeton University in 1985.

== Research and career ==
Debenedetti's research focuses on theoretical and computational investigations of the structure, dynamics, thermodynamics, and statistical mechanics of liquids and glasses. He has published over 300 scientific papers. and a book, Metastable Liquids: Concepts and Principles.

Debenedetti has made numerous contributions to fundamental understanding of the microscopic structure of supercritical fluids, the theory of nucleation, the theory of hydrophobicity, the glass transition, protein thermodynamics, and the structure and thermodynamics of supercooled water. Using advanced sampling techniques, his group demonstrated computationally the existence of a metastable liquid-liquid phase transition in a molecular model of water. His work has been cited more than 46,000 times.

He served as the chair of the department of chemical engineering from 1996 to 2004 and was the vice dean of the school of engineering and applied science from 2008 to 2013. He was appointed Princeton's Dean for Research in 2013 and served in this role through August, 2023.

== Awards and honors ==
Debenedetti has received numerous awards and honors.

- Presidential Young Investigator, National Science Foundation, 1987
- Teacher-Scholar Award, Camille and Henry Dreyfus Foundation, 1989
- Guggenheim Fellow, John Simon Guggenheim Memorial Foundation, 1991
- Best Professional/Scholarly Book in Chemistry, Metastable Liquids, Association of American Publishers, 1997
- Professional Progress Award, American Institute of Chemical Engineers, 1997
- Elected to the National Academy of Engineering, 2000
- John M. Prausnitz Award in Applied Chemical Thermodynamics, 2001
- Joel Henry Hildebrand Award in the Theoretical and Experimental Chemistry of Liquids, American Chemical Society, 2008
- Elected to the American Academy of Arts and Sciences, 2008
- Distinguished Teacher Award, School of Engineering and Applied Science, Princeton University, 2008
- President's Award for Distinguished Teaching, Princeton University, 2008
- William H. Walker Award, American Institute of Chemical Engineers, 2008
- American Association for the Advancement of Science, Fellow, 2011
- Elected to the National Academy of Sciences, 2012
- Fellow, American Institute of Chemical Engineers, 2013
- Institute Lecturer, American Institute of Chemical Engineers, 2013
- Benjamin Garver Lamme Award, American Society for Engineering Education, 2014
- Fellow, American Physical Society, 2015
- Phi Beta Kappa Teaching Award, Princeton University, 2016
- Guggenheim Medal, Institution of Chemical Engineers, 2017
- Alpha Chi Sigma Award, American Institute of Chemical Engineers, 2019
- Aneesur Rahman Prize for Computational Physics, American Physical Society, 2023.

In 2008, he was named one of the 100 chemical engineers of the modern era by the American Institute of Chemical Engineers (AIChE) Centennial Celebration Committee.

== Selected publications ==
- P.G. Debenedetti, Metastable Liquids. Concepts and Principles. Princeton (1996)
- S. Sastry, P.G. Debenedetti, F. Sciortino and H.E. Stanley, "Singularity-free interpretation of the thermodynamics of supercooled water." Phys. Rev. E, 53, 6144 (1996).
- S. Sastry, P.G. Debenedetti and F.H. Stillinger, "Signatures of distinct dynamical regimes in the energy landscape of a glass-forming liquid." Nature, 393, 554 (1998).
- J.R. Errington and P.G. Debenedetti, "Relationship between structural order and the anomalies of liquid water." Nature, 409, 318 (2001).
- P.G. Debenedetti and F.H. Stillinger, "Supercooled liquids and the glass transition." Nature, 410, 259 (2001).
- J.C. Palmer, F. Martelli, Y. Liu, R. Car, A.Z. Panagiotopoulos and P.G. Debenedetti, "Metastable liquid-liquid transition in a molecular model of water." Nature, 510, 385 (2014).
- A. Haji-Akbari and P.G. Debenedetti, "Direct calculation of ice homogeneous nucleation rate for a molecular model of water." PNAS, 112, 10582 (2015).
- P.G. Debenedetti, F. Sciortino and G.H. Zerze, "Second critical point in two realistic models of water." Science, 369, 289 (2020).
- P.M. Piaggi, J. Weis, A.Z. Panagiotopoulos, P.G. Debenedetti and R. Car, "Homogeneous ice nucleation in an ab-initio machine-learning model of water." PNAS, 119, e2207294119 (2022).
