= Dry ice bomb =

Simple explosive device

A disposable water bottle with dry ice inside a watermelon

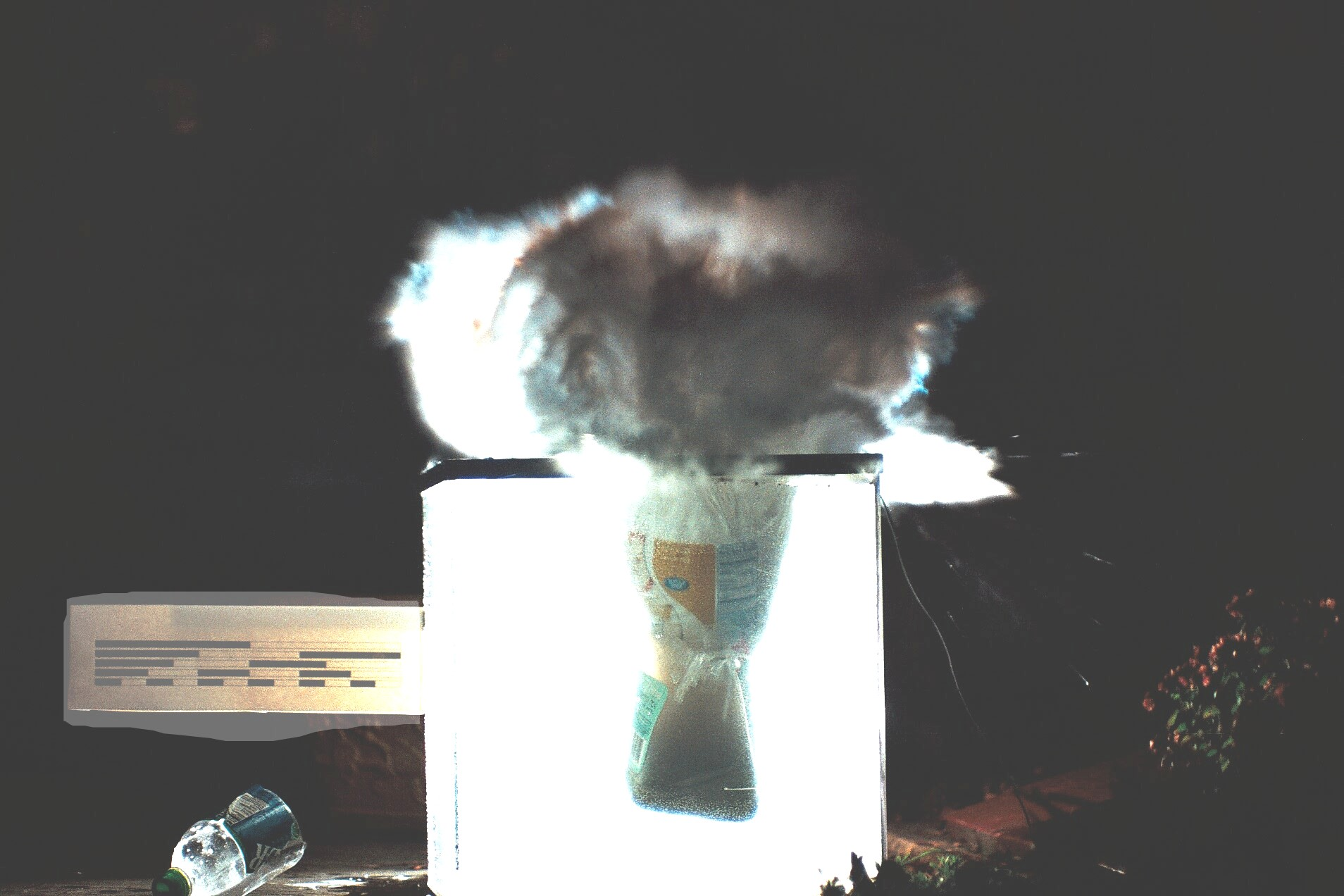
Dry ice bomb exploding in water.

A dry ice bomb is a simple explosive device consisting of dry ice and water in a sealed container.

== Overview ==
Dry ice bombs are commonly made from simple materials such as a plastic bottle, water, and dry ice. The bottle is partly filled with water and pieces of dry ice are added with the container being closed tightly soon after. As the solid carbon dioxide warms, it sublimates to gas and the pressure in the bottle increases. Bombs typically rupture within 30 seconds to half an hour, dependent largely on the temperature of the air outside the bottle. A dry ice bomb may develop frost on its exterior prior to exploding.

== Dangers ==
Dry ice bombs can explode within seconds due to the rapid sublimation of dry ice, injuring the handler. The abrupt release of high-pressure gas creates a loud noise, which can cause hearing damage even at substantial distances. Fragments thrown at high speeds can cut or puncture. Bombs that fail to go off cannot be safely approached, as they can spontaneously explode.

Dry ice bombs can also be unintentionally made, especially if dry ice is left in an airtight container for extended periods of time.

Injuries caused by dry ice bombs are common, with glass bottles in particular posing risks of serious injury or death. (Note: Attributed to multiple sources:) In one case, the explosive release of carbon dioxide gas ruptured the esophagus of a child, requiring emergency surgery.

== Legality ==
Dry ice bombs are illegal in many jurisdictions. In the United States, manufacturing one or using one can lead to imprisonment, even if no one was injured.

- A law in California that defines "destructive device" includes a list of "weapons" including "[any] sealed device containing dry ice (CO_{2}) or other chemically reactive substances assembled for the purpose of causing an explosion by a chemical reaction".
- In Nebraska and other States the noise generated may violate local laws.
- Arizona prohibits dry ice bombs if there is an intent to cause injury, death, or damage to the property of another, as well as their possession by "prohibited possessors" such as convicted felons and illegal immigrants.
- In Utah, simple possession of a dry ice bomb or similar pressurized chemical reaction bomb is a second-degree felony. In 2018, Grant Thompson (The King of Random), a popular internet scientist, was charged with felonies for making a video where he put dry ice in a coke bottle.
- In Colorado, the creation of a dry ice bomb is considered illegal due to interpretation as "possession of an explosive device"
- Leaving an unexploded dry ice bomb can be construed as public endangerment.
- Exploding a dry ice bomb in public in Pennsylvania can result in criminal charges if it is not done on a bomb range, gun range or open area.

== See also ==
- Spud gun
- Diet Coke and Mentos eruption
- Chlorine bomb
- Rapid phase transition
- Liquid nitrogen cocktail
