= Explosive boiling =

In physical chemistry, explosive boiling or phase explosion is a process in which a superheated metastable liquid undergoes an explosive liquid–vapour phase transition into a stable two-phase state because of a massive homogeneous nucleation of vapour bubbles. M. M. Martynyuk pioneered this concept in 1976 and then later advanced by Fucke and Seydel.

== Mechanism ==
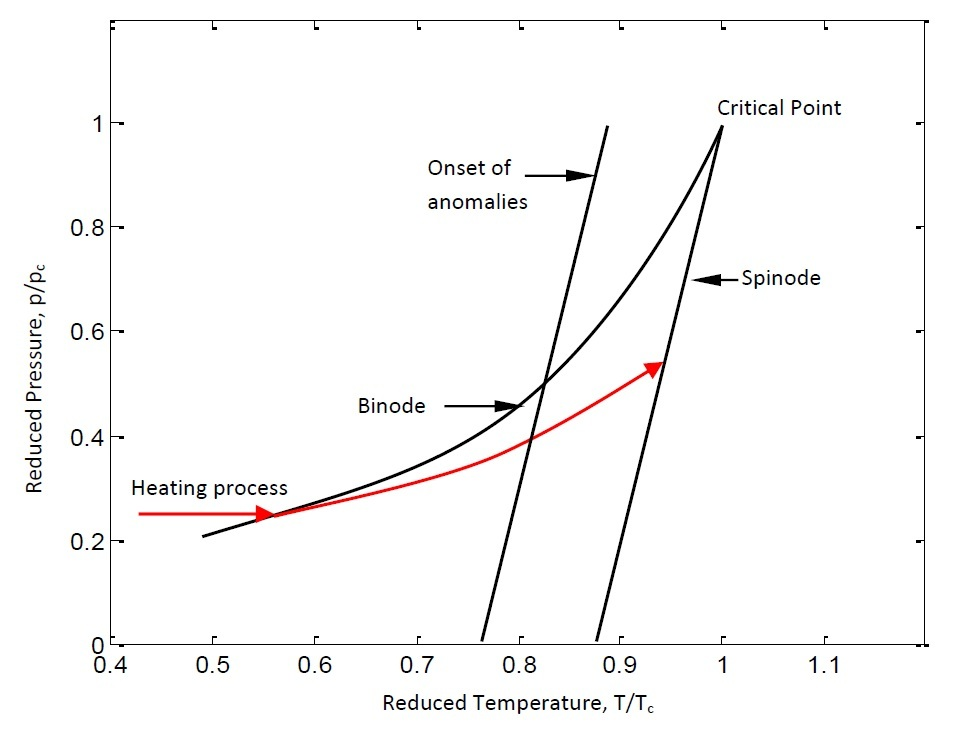
Binodal, spinodal and a typical heating cycle (red line)

Explosive boiling can be best described by a pressure–temperature (p–T) phase diagram. The figure on the right shows a typical p–T phase diagram of a substance. The binodal line, or coexistence curve, is a thermodynamic state in which, at that specific temperature and pressure, liquid and vapour coexist. The spinodal line on the right is the boundary of absolute instability of a solution to decomposition into multiple phases. A typical heating process is shown in red.

If the heating process is relatively slow, the liquid has enough time to relax to an equilibrium state, the liquid follows the binodal curve, and the Clausius–Clapeyron relation is still valid. During this time, heterogeneous evaporation occurs in the substance, with bubbles nucleating from impurities, surfaces, grain boundaries, etc.

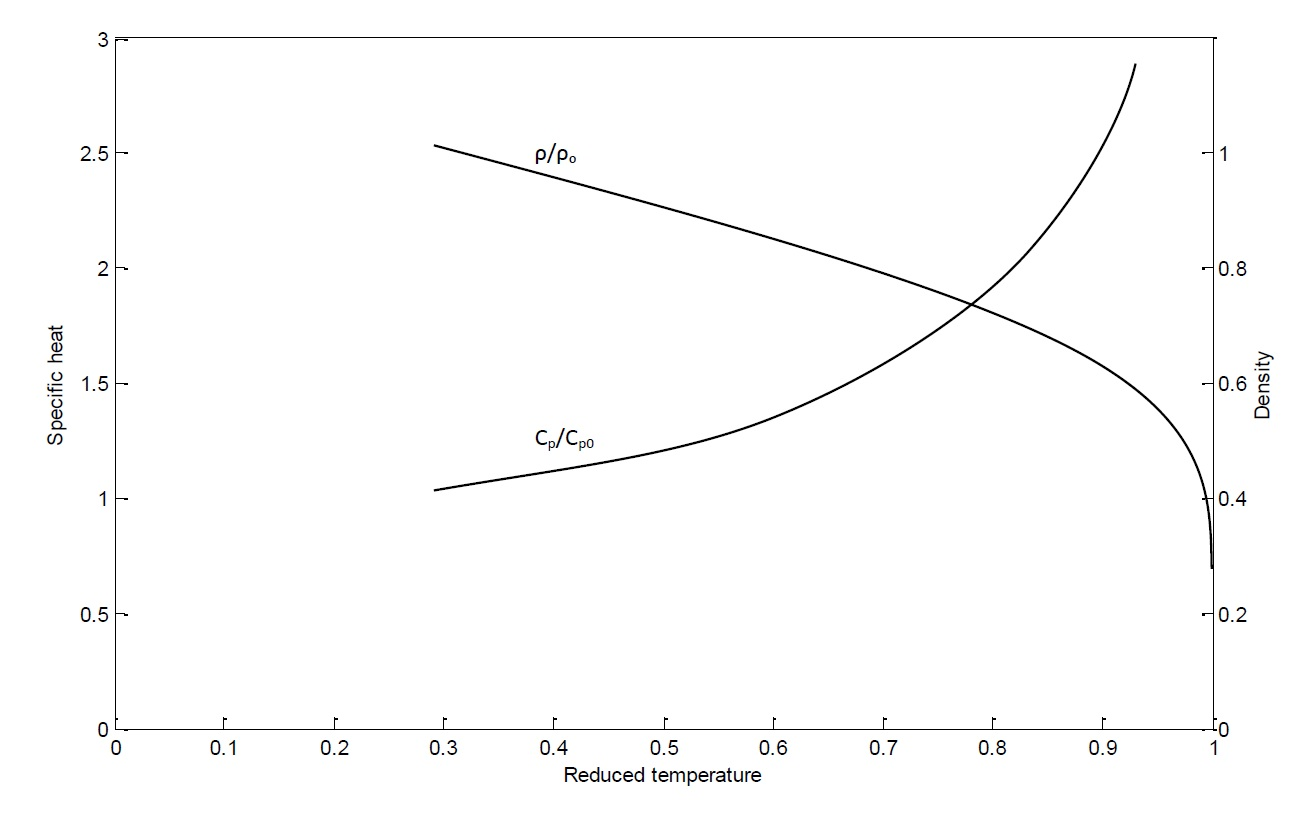
Change in density and specific heat as a function of temperature

On the other hand, if the heating process is fast enough that the substance cannot reach the binodal curve through heterogeneous boiling, the liquid becomes superheated, with its temperature above the boiling point at a given pressure. The system then shifts away from the binodal and continues to follow the red curve, thus approaching the spinodal. Near the critical temperature, thermodynamic properties like specific heat and density vary rapidly, as shown in the figure at right. Density and entropy undergo the largest fluctuation. During this time, it is possible to have a large density fluctuation in a very small volume. This fluctuation of density results in the nucleation of a bubble. The bubble nucleation process occurs homogeneously everywhere in the substance. The rate of bubble nucleation and the vapour sphere growth rate increase exponentially closer to the critical temperature. The increasing nucleation prevents the system from reaching the spinodal. When the bubble radius reaches a critical size, the bubbles continue to expand and eventually explode, resulting in a mixture of gas and droplets. This is the explosive boiling, also termed phase explosion.

Explosive boiling was used by M. M. Martynyuk to calculate the critical temperature of metals. He used electric resistance to heat metal wire. Explosive boiling was found to occur while using ultrafast femtosecond laser ablation.

== See also ==
- Boiling liquid expanding vapour explosion (BLEVE)
- Rapid phase transition
- Steam explosion
