= Rapid phase transition =

Rapid phase transition or RPT is an explosive boiling phenomenon realized in liquefied natural gas (LNG) incidents, in which LNG vaporizes violently upon coming in contact with water causing what is known as a physical explosion. During such explosions there is no combustion but rather a huge amount of energy is transferred in the form of heat from the room-temperature water to the LNG at a temperature difference of about 200 °C (350 °F).

Liquefied natural gas, or LNG, is natural gas that gets liquefied at atmospheric pressure and −161.5 °C (112.7 K; −258.7 °F). It is odorless, tasteless, colorless, and not poisonous but causes asphyxia. It can cause frostbite due to its cryogenic temperature. If saturated LNG contacts liquid water (e.g. sea water, which has an average temperature of 15 °C), heat is transferred from the water to the LNG, rapidly vaporizing it. This results in an explosion because the volume occupied by natural gas in its gaseous form is 600 times greater than when its liquefied; this is the phenomenon of rapid phase transition.

== See also ==
- BLEVE
- Dry ice bomb
