= Steam explosion =

Explosion created from a violent boiling of water

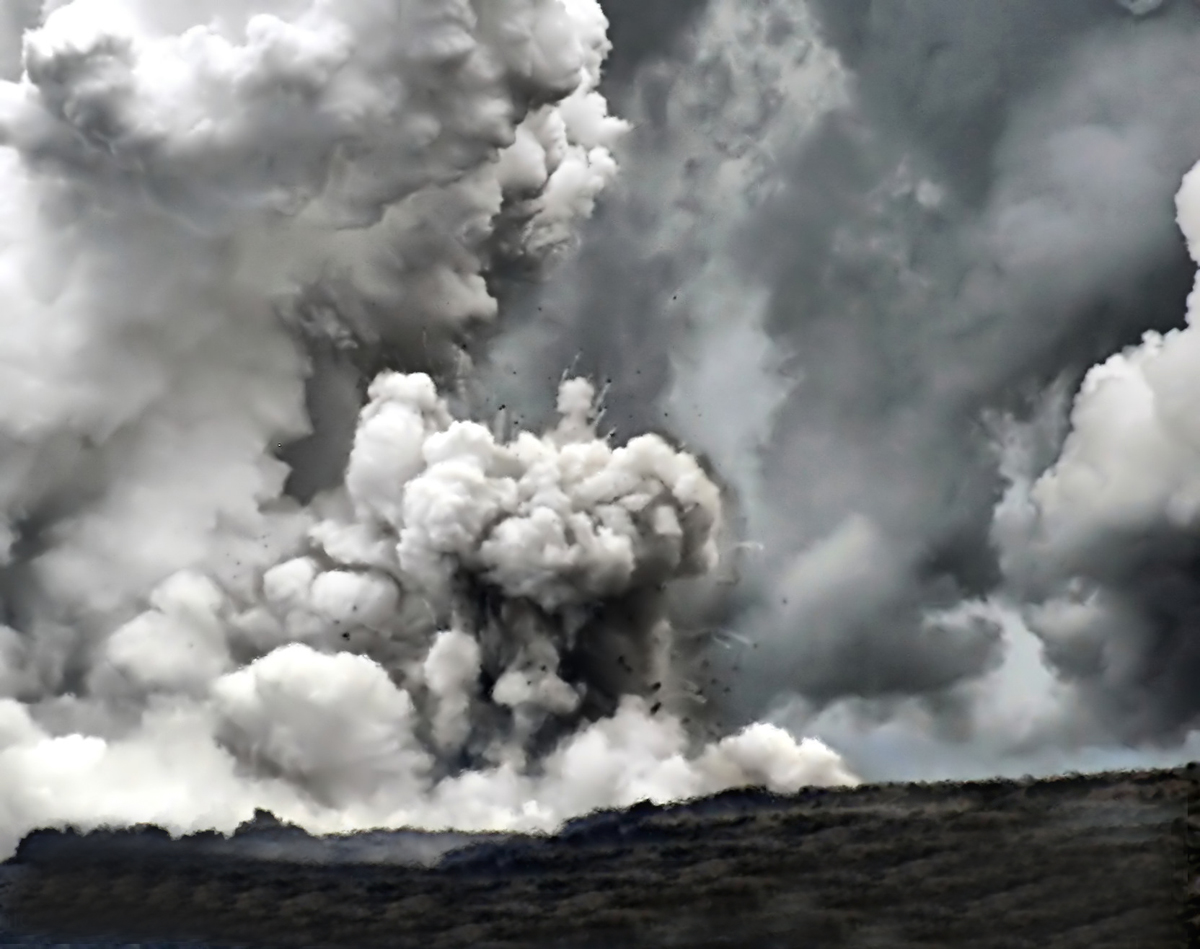
Littoral explosion at Waikupanaha ocean entry at the big island of Hawaii was caused by the lava entering the ocean

A steam explosion is an explosion caused by violent boiling or flashing of water or ice into steam, it occurs when water or ice is either superheated, rapidly heated by fine hot debris produced within it, or heated by the interaction of molten metals (as in a fuel–coolant interaction, or FCI, of molten nuclear-reactor fuel rods with water in a nuclear reactor core following a core-meltdown). Steam explosions are instances of explosive boiling. Pressure vessels, such as pressurized water (nuclear) reactors, that operate above atmospheric pressure can also provide the conditions for a steam explosion. The water changes from a solid or liquid to a gas with extreme speed, increasing dramatically in volume. A steam explosion sprays steam and boiling-hot water and the hot medium that heated it in all directions (if not otherwise confined, e.g. by the walls of a container), creating a danger of scalding and burning.

Steam explosions are not normally chemical explosions, although a number of substances react chemically with steam (for example, zirconium and superheated graphite (impure carbon, C) react with steam and air respectively to give off hydrogen (H_{2}), which may explode violently in air (O_{2}) to form water or H_{2}O) so that chemical explosions and fires may follow. Some steam explosions appear to be special kinds of boiling liquid expanding vapor explosion (BLEVE), and rely on the release of stored superheat. But many large-scale events, including foundry accidents, show evidence of an energy-release front propagating through the material (see description of FCI below), where the forces create fragments and mix the hot phase into the cold volatile one; and the rapid heat transfer at the front sustains the propagation.

Mechanisms of Steam Explosions

The initiation of steam explosions while not fully understood and many areas remain a subject of ongoing research (unknown areas usually consist of incidents at large scales).

== Examples ==
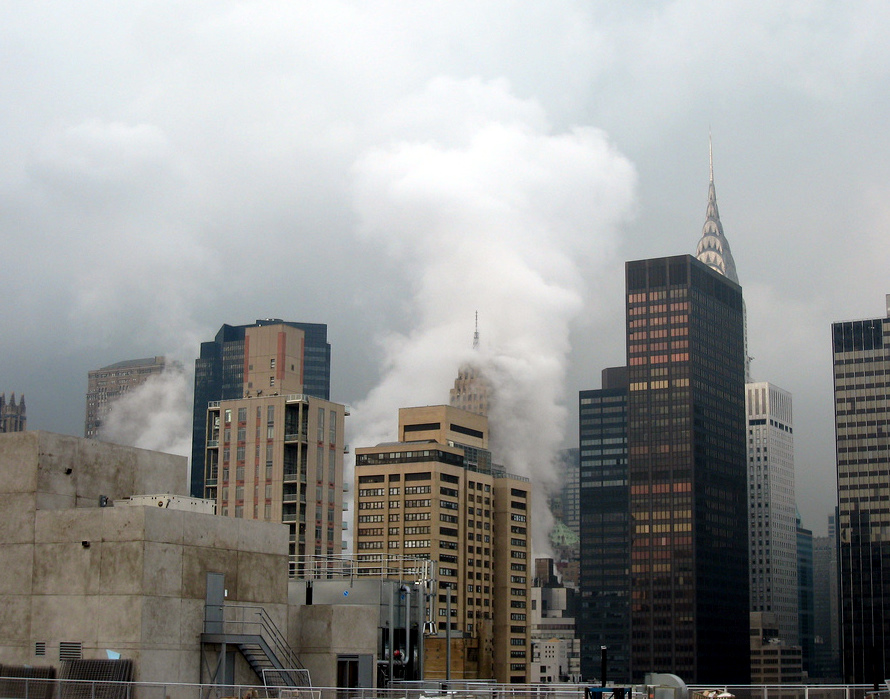
A jet of steam rising higher than the Chrysler Building during the 2007 New York City steam explosion

High steam generation rates can occur under other circumstances, such as boiler-drum failure, or at a quench front (for example when water re-enters a hot dry boiler). Though potentially damaging, they are usually less energetic than events in which the hot ("fuel") phase is molten and so can be finely fragmented within the volatile ("coolant") phase. Some examples follow:

=== Natural ===
Steam explosions are naturally produced by certain volcanoes, especially stratovolcanoes, and are a major cause of human fatalities in volcanic eruptions. They are often encountered where hot lava meets sea water or ice. Such an occurrence is also called a littoral explosion. A dangerous steam explosion can also be created when liquid water or ice encounters hot, molten metal. As the water explodes into steam, it splashes the burning hot liquid metal along with it, causing an extreme risk of severe burns to anyone located nearby and creating a fire hazard.

=== Boiler explosions ===
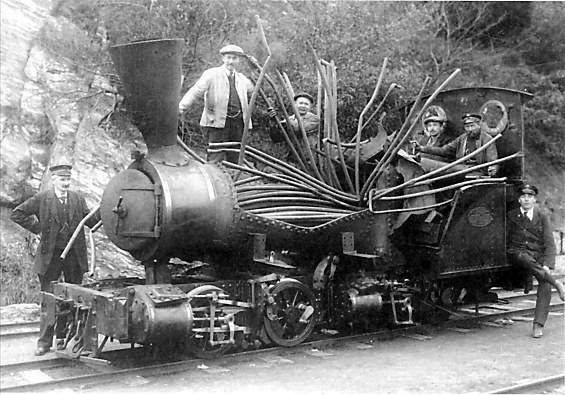
Boiler explosions are a type of steam explosion.

When a pressurized container such as the waterside of a steam boiler ruptures, it is always followed by some degree of steam explosion. A common operating temperature and pressure for a marine boiler is around 950 psi (6,600 kPa) and 850 °F (454 °C) at the outlet of the superheater.

A steam boiler has an interface of steam and water in the steam drum, which is where the water is finally evaporating due to the heat input, usually oil-fired burners. When a water tube fails due to any of a variety of reasons, it causes the water in the boiler to expand out of the opening into the furnace area that is only a few psi above atmospheric pressure. This will likely extinguish all fires and expands over the large surface area on the sides of the boiler.

To decrease the likelihood of a devastating explosion, boilers have gone from the "fire-tube" designs, where the heat was added by passing hot gases through tubes in a body of water, to "water-tube" boilers that have the water inside of the tubes and the furnace area is around the tubes. Old "fire-tube" boilers often failed due to poor build quality or lack of maintenance (such as corrosion of the fire tubes, or fatigue of the boiler shell due to constant expansion and contraction).

A failure of fire tubes forces large volumes of high pressure, high temperature steam back down the fire tubes in a fraction of a second and often blows the burners off the front of the boiler, whereas a failure of the pressure vessel surrounding the water would lead to a full and entire evacuation of the boiler's contents in a large steam explosion. On a marine boiler, this would certainly destroy the ship's propulsion plant and possibly the corresponding end of the ship.

Tanks containing crude oil and certain commercial oil cuts, such as some diesel oils and kerosene, may be subject to boilover, an extremely hazardous situation in which a water layer under an open-top tank pool fire starts boiling, which results in a significant increase in fire intensity accompanied by violent expulsion of burning fluid to the surrounding areas. In many cases, the underlying water layer is superheated, in which case part of it goes through explosive boiling. When this happens, the abruptness of the expansion further enhances the expulsion of blazing fuel.

Boil over overview

Although the general concept of boil over is known, it is essential to understand the particularities of heat transfer involved to ensure proper safety engineering. According to Broeckmann and Schecker 1995, the phenomenon does not merely consist in a phase change. The boil over process entails a heat layer penetrating the fuel layer progressively from above due to distillation phenomena. Once it comes into contact with the layer of water below, an explosive flash can take place. This is amplified by the viscosity of the oil, which hinders the growth of steam bubbles. As a result, the pressure inside the system steadily rises, leading to a sudden release of accumulated energy. Another finding that the authors present is that the explosiveness of the event is positively related to the degree of "superheating" of the water layer. In other words, the temperature in the layer of water could be elevated to a significantly higher temperature than that of ordinary boiling water, thus resulting in even more catastrophic consequences than in conventional steam boiler explosions.

=== Nuclear reactor meltdown ===
Events of this general type are also possible if the fuel and fuel elements of a water-cooled nuclear reactor gradually melt. The mixture of molten core structures and fuel is often referred to as corium.

If such corium comes into contact with water, vapor explosions may occur from the violent interaction between molten fuel (corium) and water as coolant. Such explosions are seen to be fuel–coolant interactions (FCI).

Reactor meltdowns typically occur by blowing up the fuel rods, and the fuel rods are blown up in one of two ways. The first is by blowing up the water in the bottom of the vessel with a steam explosion and the other is by blowing up the water above the fuel. The second is called "alpha" mode failure because when the bottom of the reactor vessel blows off, it will not only destroy the reactor core, but it may also destroy the containment structure. A steam explosion is generally classified as a fuel coolant interaction. According to Theofanous et al. 1987 they developed an initial probabilistic assessment by studying this specific scenario. In this study they found that while this type of event can occur physically the chance of it occurring would be nearly zero because the molten fuel and water would have to be nearly totally mixed together.

Additionally in a recent study conducted by Theofanous and Yuen in 1995, further research was conducted which regarded this process as the result of fluid dynamics. The researchers discovered that the molten fuel creates a layer of vapor around itself that functions as a barrier and reduces the rate at which the molten fuel transfers heat, therefore, large scale explosions are improbable. In another research, Magallon 2009 which examined experimental records that determined that small steam explosions are expected during a meltdown, but large scale explosions that could destroy modern containment structures are unlikely in a realistic situation. As a result of these types of research, modern reactor safety systems are designed to manage the pressure and cooling conditions and do not consider a massive blast as a worst case blast any longer.

Despite various efforts on the part of the experimenters, it was never possible to trigger a steam explosion in the corium experiments in FARO.

If a steam explosion occurs in a confined tank of water due to rapid heating of the water, the pressure wave and rapidly expanding steam can cause severe water hammer. This was the mechanism that, in Idaho, USA, in 1961, caused the SL-1 nuclear reactor vessel to jump over 9 feet (2.7 m) in the air when it was destroyed by a criticality accident. In the case of SL-1, the fuel and fuel elements vaporized from instantaneous overheating.

In January 1961, operator error caused the SL-1 reactor to instantly destroy itself in a steam explosion. The 1986 Chernobyl nuclear disaster in the Soviet Union was feared to cause major steam explosion (and resulting Europe-wide nuclear fallout) upon melting the lava-like nuclear fuel through the reactor's basement towards contact with residue fire-fighting water and groundwater. The threat was averted by frantic tunneling underneath the reactor in order to pump out water and reinforce underlying soil with concrete.

In a nuclear meltdown, the most severe outcome of a steam explosion is early containment building failure. Two possibilities are the ejection at high pressure of molten fuel into the containment, causing rapid heating; or an in-vessel steam explosion causing ejection of a missile (such as the upper head) into, and through, the containment. Less dramatic but still significant is that the molten mass of fuel and reactor core melts through the floor of the reactor building and reaches ground water; a steam explosion might occur, but the debris would probably be contained, and would in fact, being dispersed, probably be more easily cooled. See WASH-1400 for details.

=== Further examples ===
Further examples of steam explosions and related hazards can occur in industrial and domestic settings, these settings provide possible interactions between water and high temperature materials or substances that can lead to rapid phase change or combined physical and chemical energy release.

One example in particular involves the use of molten aluminum, molten aluminum presents a particular hazard because of its possible involvement in chemical reactions under specific conditions. A 2019 study by Maguire and Woodcock examined interactions between aluminum and water at high temperatures, similar to those encountered in large structural fires. The study found that molten aluminum can react with water by reducing water molecules, this reaction forms aluminum oxide and releases both hydrogen gas and energy in the form of additional heat. In conclusion, explosions involving molten aluminum may not be purely steam driven events, and instead, they could be an involved combination of rapid vaporization followed by hydrogen gas production, which may increase the overall severity if ignition conditions are present. This means that the use of water, such as from sprinkler systems, may in some cases worsen the hazard when significant quantities of molten aluminum are present instead of removing the hazard.

In a more domestic setting, steam explosions can be a result of trying to extinguish burning oil with water, in a process called slopover. When oil in a pan is on fire, the natural impulse may be to extinguish it with water; however, doing so will cause the hot oil to superheat the water. The resulting steam will disperse upwards and outwards rapidly and violently in a spray also containing the ignited oil. The correct method to extinguish such fires is to use either a damp cloth or a tight lid on the pan; both methods deprive the fire of oxygen, and the cloth also cools it down. Alternatively, a non-volatile purpose designed fire retardant agent or simply a fire blanket can be used.

== Practical uses ==
=== Biomass refinement ===
Steam explosive biorefinement is an industrial application to valorize biomass. It involves pressurizing biomass with steam at up to 3 MPa (30 atmospheres) and instantaneously releasing the pressure to produce the desired transformation in the biomass. An industrial application of the concept has been shown for a paper fiber project.

=== Steam turbines ===
A water vapor explosion creates a high volume of gas without producing environmentally harmful leftovers. The controlled explosion of water has been used for generating steam in power stations and in modern types of steam turbines. Newer steam engines use heated oil to force drops of water to explode and create high pressure in a controlled chamber. The pressure is then used to run a turbine or a converted combustion engine. Hot oil and water explosions are becoming particularly popular in concentrated solar generators, because the water can be separated from the oil in a closed loop without any external energy. Water explosion is considered to be environmentally friendly if the heat is generated by a renewable resource.

=== Flash boiling in cooking ===
A cooking technique called flash boiling uses a small amount of water to quicken the process of boiling. For example, this technique can be used to melt a slice of cheese onto a hamburger patty. The cheese slice is placed on top of the meat on a hot surface such as a frying pan, and a small quantity of cold water is thrown onto the surface near the patty. A vessel (such as a pot or frying-pan cover) is then used to quickly seal the steam-flash reaction, dispersing much of the steamed water on the cheese and patty. This results in a large release of heat, transferred via vaporized water condensing back into a liquid (a principle also used in refrigerator and freezer production).

=== Other uses ===
Internal combustion engines may use flash-boiling to aerosolize the fuel.

== See also ==
- Multiphase flow

== Bibliography ==
- Nelson, Lloyd S.; Brooks, Paul W.; Bonazza, Riccardo; Corradini, Michael L. (December 1999). "Triggering steam explosions of single drops of a molten ferrosilicon alloy with a simple encapsulated mechanical impactor". Metallurgical and Materials Transactions B. 30 (6): 1083–1088. Bibcode:1999MMTB...30.1083N. doi:10.1007/s11663-999-0114-6.
