= Chlorine bomb =

Simple explosive device

A chlorine bomb is a small explosive device which uses the pressure of chemically produced chlorine gas or other chlorine-containing gases such as hydrogen chloride to produce an explosion. It is made with an airtight container part-filled with different types of chlorine tablet and other reagents. The reaction produces an expansive increase in pressure, eventually rupturing the container. Usually, such a device is not made on a large scale, often being manufactured from common household objects.

Such a device is a more toxic and acidic alternative to a dry ice bomb, but likewise typically made by young people for amusement and recreational use rather than with any intent to harm. However, exposure to chlorinous gases and the reactive substances involved can cause respiratory problems from inhalation and also cause injury to other mucous membranes, similar to tear gas. Most injuries relating to these devices involve bruised hands, blinding and other eye injuries.

Contrary to the belief of chemical laymen and some public security experts, chlorine is not generated by the reaction of hydrochloric acid with ammonia, but instead ammonium chloride is produced. Also chlorine is not formed by the reaction of chlorine bleach with ammonia. The reaction of bleach with ammonia forms monochloramine, nitrogen trichloride, and a number of other toxic and explosive products depending on the circumstances of the chemical reaction, but not pure chlorine.

== See also ==
- Dry ice bomb
- Pipe bomb
