= 2018 Borgo Panigale explosion =

Road accident in Italy

- Collapsed viaduct after the explosion with charred remains of the tanker pressure vessel
- Native name: Esplosione di Borgo Panigale
- Date: 6 August 2018
- Time: Vehicle collision: 1:44 pm; Explosion: 1:51 pm; (CEST; UTC+02:00)
- Location: A14 autostrada (motorway) within the Borgo Panigale neighbourhood of Bologna, Italy; 44°30′55.05″N 11°16′48.85″E
- Type: LPG road tanker boiling-liquid expanding-vapour explosion (BLEVE)
- Cause: Vehicle collision
- Deaths: 2
- Injuries: 145

On 6 August 2018, the collision of a liquefied petroleum gas (LPG) road tanker with an articulated lorry carrying flammable solvents and a car transporter resulted in a huge explosion on the A14 motorway within Borgo Panigale, a neighbourhood of Bologna, Italy. It was a case of boiling-liquid expanding-vapour explosion (BLEVE), where nearly all the road tanker cargo combusted in a matter of seconds upon release, generating a tremendous amount of thermal radiation. The accident killed two people, injured 145 and caused significant damage to the surrounding commercial and residential area. One span of the viaduct where it happened collapsed and a gash opened in the motorway.

== Vehicle collision ==
The collision involved a liquefied petroleum gas (LPG) road tanker, another articulated lorry carrying flammable solvents, and a car transporter. It took place on the northbound carriageway of the ramo Casalecchio (Casalecchio branch) of the A14 motorway, which connects the A1 motorway to the A14 main route, within Borgo Panigale, a neighbourhood of Bologna, Italy. The stretch of motorway where the collision occurred crosses a densely populated area in the outskirts of Bologna and is flanked on both sides by the Tangenziale di Bologna, or Bologna ring road. Luckily, many businesses were closed due to the summer holidays.

The collision was caused by the road tanker, which rear-ended a near-stationary lorry laden with class-3 flammable solvents in intermediate bulk containers (IBC). Pushed from behind by the impact, the second lorry rear-ended the car transporter directly in front. The crash occurred at 1:44 pm. The cause of the collision is unknown. Cameras captured the tanker heading straight into the preceding vehicle, which possibly eliminates the hypothesis of mechanical failure, because steering and brakes would have needed to fail at the same time. The driver was complying with all applicable rest regulations and speed limit. The tanker pressure vessel was also mechanically sound. The amount of LPG in the tanker was estimated at 23 or 25 tonnes.

== Initial fire and BLEVE ==
The cargo of the rear-ended lorry ignited immediately, which resulted in a large pool fire engulfing the affected vehicles. The source of ignition was either engine or exhaust hot surfaces or mechanical sparks. By chance, police units were on the spot at the time of the collision and diverted traffic away, both on the motorway and the adjacent urban roads.

The pressure vessel of the LPG tanker did not breach as a direct consequence of the crash. However, it was surrounded by flames from the pool fire. The vessel was not fire-proofed nor did it have a relief valve. Neither arrangement is required by Italian regulations or in the international ADR agreement. Seven minutes and 20 seconds after the collision, the tank failed due to loss of mechanical properties caused by external heating. This resulted in a massive BLEVE. Fire services did not have sufficient time to reach the location before the explosion. The fireball diameter was estimated at more than 170 metres (560 ft) and its height above ground at 130 metres (430 ft). Its duration was around 8 seconds.

This BLEVE is notable because it caused the collapse of the span of viaduct on which it happened. Computer simulations have assessed a blast overpressure of about 500 kPa at short distances from the source, a value sufficient to cause the failure of a road bridge like the one involved in the explosion.

== Aftermath ==
Given the tremendous thermal radiation, people within a radius of 100 metres (330 ft) from the exploded road tanker would have died or received major injuries. The explosion sent fragments hundreds of meters away and shattered windows up to 500 metres (1,600 ft) away. Buildings were damaged as far as 200 metres (660 ft) away. A nearby car dealer lot caught fire and all the cars on sale were destroyed as a consequence. A second car dealer on-sale stock was also affected. Fires were extinguished two hours after the explosion.

The road tanker driver died on the spot upon the first collision. A second victim died on 14 August. Thirteen among those hospitalized were policemen (11 carabinieri and two from the Polizia Stradale, or the Italian highway patrol). Prime minister Giuseppe Conte visited the injured at the Ospedale Maggiore in Bologna, where most of the wounded had been hospitalized, and the burn unit in Cesena. The other burn victims had been transported to the Parma burn unit.
