= Liquid carbon dioxide =

Chemical compound at -56.6–31.1 °C and above 5.1 atm

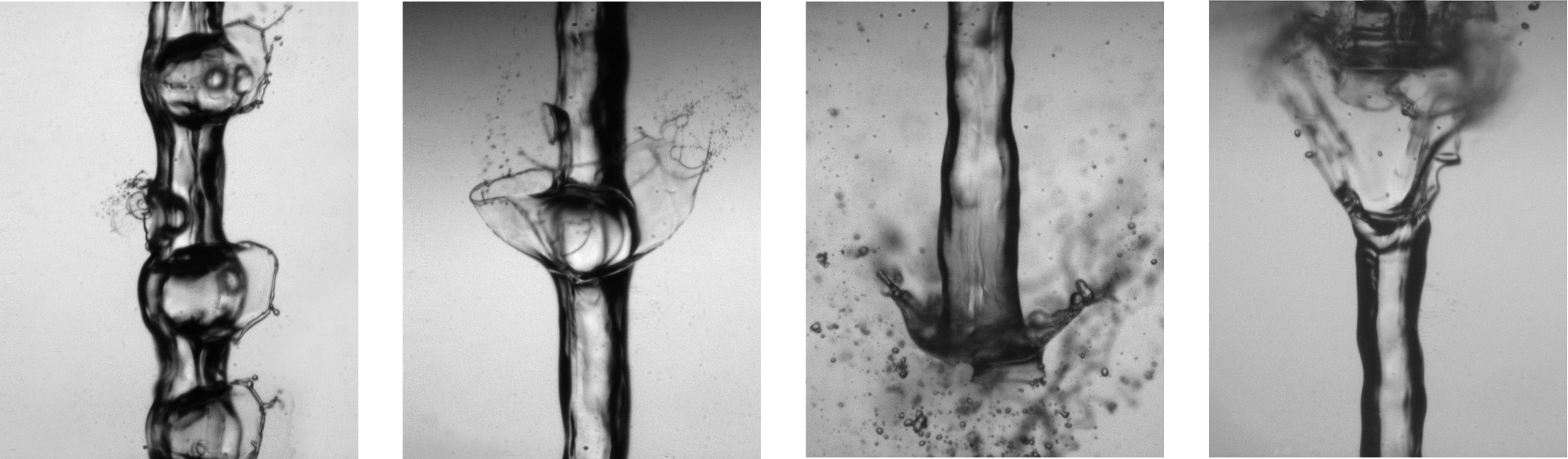
Jets of liquid carbon dioxide

Liquid carbon dioxide is the liquid form of carbon dioxide (CO_{2}). At normal atmospheric pressure, carbon dioxide can only exist as a gas or solid, and is ordinarily found as a trace gas in Earth's atmosphere. Its liquid state can exist at pressures above 5.1 atm (5.2 bar; 75 psi), between the temperatures of its triple point, −56.6 °C (−69.9 °F) and its critical point, 31.1 °C (88.0 °F). Solid CO_{2}, known as dry ice, occurs at low temperatures, and has commercial applications. Dry ice sublimes above −78.5 °C (−109.3 °F) at atmospheric pressure—that is, it transitions directly from solid to gas without an intermediate liquid stage. The uses and applications of liquid carbon dioxide include extracting virgin olive oil from olive paste, in fire extinguishers, and as a coolant. With supercritical carbon dioxide, liquid carbon dioxide is used for decaffeinating coffee.

== Properties ==
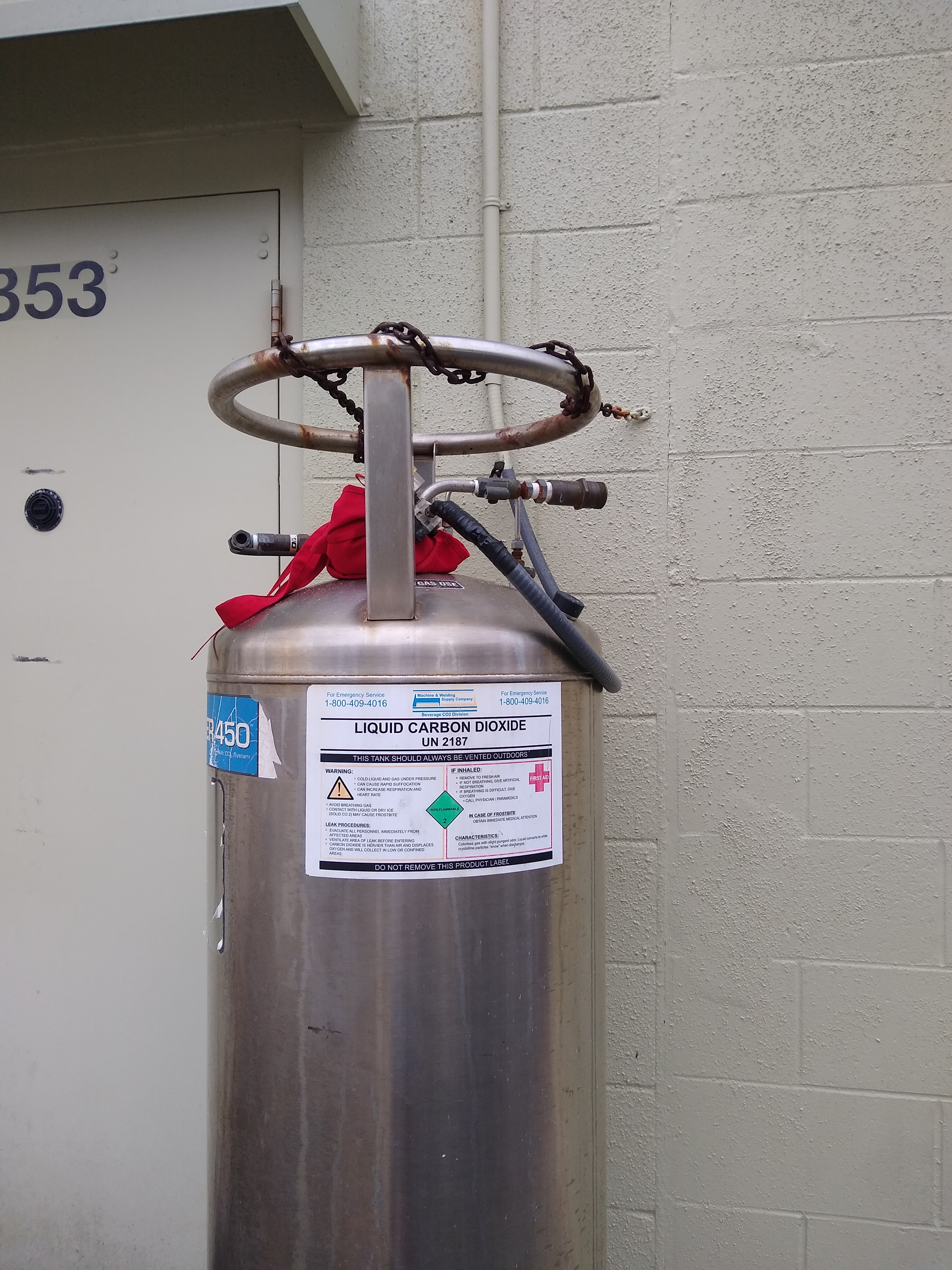
A container of liquid carbon dioxide behind a restaurant

Liquid carbon dioxide is a type of liquid which is formed from highly compressed and cooled gaseous carbon dioxide. It does not form under atmospheric conditions. It only exists when the pressure is above 5.1 atm and the temperature is under 31.1 °C (88.0 °F) (temperature of critical point) and above −56.6 °C (−69.9 °F) (temperature of triple point). The chemical symbol remains the same as gaseous carbon dioxide (CO_{2}). It is transparent and odorless, and its density is 1101 kg/m^{3} when the liquid is at full saturation at −37 °C (−35 °F), decreasing to half that near its critical point.

The solubility of water in liquid carbon dioxide is measured in a range of temperatures, ranging from −29 °C (−20 °F) to 22.6 °C (72.7 °F). At this temperature, the pressure is measured in a range from 15 to 60 atmospheres. The solubility turned out to be very low: from 0.02 to 0.10 %.

Carbon dioxide pressure-temperature phase diagram

== Uses ==
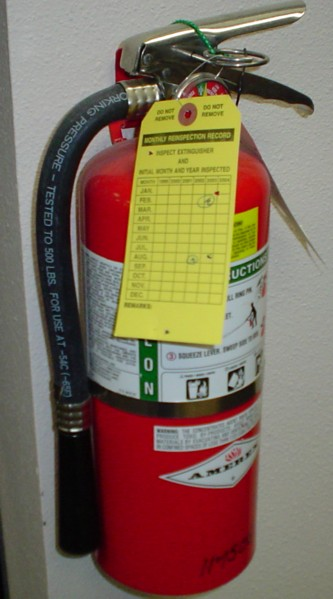
Fire extinguisher

Liquid carbon dioxide is used for the preservation of food, in fire extinguishers, and in commercial food processes. For food preservation, liquid carbon dioxide is used to refrigerate, preserve, store, and soften. In a fire extinguisher, the CO_{2} is stored under pressure as a liquid to act as an anti-flammable. The liquid carbon dioxide not only reduces combustion by displacing oxygen, but also cools the burning surface to avoid further damage. Solvent extraction using compressed liquid CO_{2} can be used in industrial processes such as removing caffeine from coffee or improving the yield of olive oil production.

Liquid carbon dioxide is tested as a means of CO_{2} transportation for underground or subsea storage purposes. Due to its high density as a liquid, it is much more feasible to ship than as a gas.

CO_{2} is also used in large-scale heat pumps for district heating, replacing less-environmentally-friendly refrigerants. The CO_{2} changes phases between liquid and gaseous in the process.

== See also ==
Other chemical compounds and elements are commonly used for commercial and research purposes in their liquid state:

- Liquid oxygen
- Liquid nitrogen
- Liquid helium
- Liquid hydrogen
- Supercritical carbon dioxide
