= Zarzalico =

- Location within Murcia Location within Spain
- Coordinates: 37.62557°N 1.92843°W
- Country: Spain
- Province: Murcia
- Municipality: Lorca

Population
  - Total: 115

Zarzalico is a village in Murcia, Spain. It is part of the municipality of Lorca.
