= Robert Reid (chemical engineer) =

American chemical engineer and academic

Robert C. Reid (June 11, 1924, Denver, Colorado – May 18, 2006, Lexington, Massachusetts) was a chemical engineer and professor at MIT. He received his B.A. from the U.S. Merchant Marine Academy and a master's degree from Purdue University as well as an Sc.D. from MIT.

He is best known for his work in the field of thermodynamics, particularly in co-authoring the thermodynamics reference book "Thermodynamics and Its Applications" with Mike Modell. He also co-wrote "The Properties of Gases and Liquids," another reference work.

He was the editor of the American Institute of Chemical Engineers Journal, AIchE Journal, from 1972 to 1976, and directed the American Institute of Chemical Engineers from 1969 to 1971. He taught at MIT for 34 years, from 1951 to 1985, and was famous for dressing up as Willard Gibbs for certain lectures. He pushed to change the MIT chemical engineering department's unofficial policy of hiring only its own graduates.

In addition to his work in the field of chemical engineering, Robert Reid served in the Merchant Marine during World War II aboard an oil tanker.
