= Memphis tanker truck disaster =

1988 explosion and fire in Memphis, Tennessee, United States

- The tank among damaged structures

Details
- Date: December 23, 1988 c. 10:15am (CST)
- Location: I-40/I-240 Midtown Interchange, Memphis, Tennessee
- Coordinates: 35°09′05.6″N 90°01′17.3″W
- Country: United States
- Incident type: Traffic collision, tanker truck explosion
- Cause: Loss of control of tanker truck by driver, BLEVE

Statistics
- Vehicles: ~20
- Deaths: 9
- Injured: 10

On December 23, 1988, a tractor-trailer tanker truck hauling liquefied propane crashed on an exit ramp at the Interstate 40/Interstate 240 (I-40/I-240) interchange in downtown Memphis, Tennessee, US. The crash ruptured the tank; the leaking gas exploded, setting multiple vehicles and structures on fire. The explosion propelled the tank 125 yards (114 m) into a residential complex and started additional fires. The accident caused nine deaths and ten injuries. The interchange where the accident occurred was considered unsafe and poorly designed, and had been the site of several previous accidents; it was completely rebuilt in the 2000s.

== Background ==
The accident occurred at the interchange in Midtown Memphis between I-40 and the western terminus of I-240. Approaching this interchange from the west, I-40 travels in an east–west alignment and shifts into a north–south alignment at this interchange. I-240 also meets the interchange from a north–south alignment. The interchange was first constructed in the latter 1960s, and opened to traffic on July 14, 1971. At this time, it was planned as a four-way interchange; I-40 was to continue straight through the interchange in an east–west alignment, and I-240 was to continue north of the interchange on what is now I-40. Many residents opposed the routing east of this interchange because it was slated to pass through Overton Park, and filed a series of lawsuits to stop the interstate's construction. These lawsuits culminated in the 1971 U.S. Supreme Court case Citizens to Preserve Overton Park v. Volpe, and in 1981 the Tennessee Department of Transportation (TDOT) abandoned plans to route I-40 east of this interchange. Instead, the department redesignated the northern loop of I-240 north of this interchange as part of I-40. As a result of the original plans, however, the interchange was constructed as a four-way combination interchange, and contained several unused ramps and bridges that had been intended to carry traffic to and from I-40 east of the interchange. I-40 traffic both continuing through the interchange and exiting onto I-240 was required to use one-lane ramps, some with hazardously sharp curves. The ramp where the accident occurred was a flyover ramp with an advisory speed limit of 25 miles per hour (40 km/h). At the time of the accident, the entire interchange was considered one of the most dangerous in the state and had a crash rate much higher than the state average. TDOT had begun preliminary work in early 1988 for a project to reconstruct the interchange, estimated to cost US$100 million at the time (equivalent to $228 million in 2024).

== Accident ==
The vehicle involved in the accident was a 1986 Mack Econodyne tractor towing a 10,450-US-gallon (39,600 L) steel tank manufactured in 1964, loaded with 9,511 US gallons (36,000 L) of pressurized liquified propane. On December 23, 1988, at approximately 10:15 a.m. Central Time, the semi-trailer truck skidded off a ramp carrying traffic on I-40 eastbound at the Midtown interchange in Memphis, rolled about 1 1/4 times, and crashed into a retaining wall at the base of an overpass. The crash punctured a small hole in the front end of the tank. Leaking propane quickly enveloped both sides of the interstate in a vapor cloud, which ignited seconds later in a boiling liquid expanding vapor explosion (BLEVE) which produced a fireball estimated to be about 700 feet (210 m) wide and 700 to 800 feet (210 to 240 m) tall. This set nearby vehicles and buildings on fire and instantly killed five motorists, including the driver of the truck. The tank was then propelled from the highway by the remaining rapidly escaping and combusting gas inside of the tank, causing it to strike a nearby overpass bridge before exiting the freeway right-of-way, bouncing off the ground, striking the top of a tree, and crashing into a duplex about 125 yards (114 m) away from the crash site. This instantly killed an occupant of the complex and started a fire which subsequently spread to multiple other buildings and cars. As the tank became airborne, most of the tractor was propelled into the southbound lanes of I-40. Other parts of the truck, including tires and an axle, were hurled from the crash site into nearby homes. The crash created a traffic jam that extended several miles in all directions, and about one hour after the crash, a truck on I-240 northbound crashed into stopped vehicles at the south end of the traffic congestion, killing the driver. In addition to the truck, seven cars were completely destroyed by the explosion. Ten other cars, seven houses, and one industrial building were damaged by the explosion and subsequent fires. Ten people were injured, and two people who were inside homes impacted by the crash died the following day from their injuries. Several of the injured were treated for severe burns, and some of the deceased victims were burned beyond recognition.

== Investigation and aftermath ==
Diagram of the crash. Note that I-40 is referred to as I-240 on the right side.

Investigators from the National Transportation Safety Board arrived on the scene the following day. They determined that the truck had passed an inspection in Arkansas the day before the accident, and that the driver was familiar with the route. The driver, an employee of Wooten Transports, had picked up the load in nearby West Memphis, Arkansas, and was en route to Ellendale, about 20 miles (32 km) northeast of Memphis.

Authorities identified the deceased motorists as Randall Benson (29, driver of the tanker truck) of West Memphis, Arkansas, Harrison G. Lee (34) of Brighton, Tennessee, Robert Wardlow (40) of Memphis, Tina Wiles (30) and Warner Wiles (70), both of Vicksburg, Mississippi, and David Bailey (29, driver of second truck) of West Helena, Arkansas. Shelanda Towles (10), Iva J. Rubesheim (87), and James M. Malone (57) were identified as the deceased occupants of the homes which were impacted by the blast.

The National Fire Protection Agency (NFPA) investigated the accident and released its report on February 6, 1990. The report determined that the exact cause of both the explosion and the leakage that caused the explosion were unknown, but theorized that the tank may have been punctured by a vertical guardrail post when the truck was rolling, and the vapor may have been ignited in a house that the cloud had expanded into. Between June 2003 and December 2006, TDOT spent $53 million to completely reconstruct the interchange where the accident occurred. The unused ramps and bridges were demolished, and the interchange was converted into a directional T interchange. In addition, the interchange with SR 14 (Jackson Avenue) on I-40 directly north of the interchange was modified, and multiple auxiliary lanes and slip ramps were constructed to improve traffic flow and reduce crashes caused by sudden lane changes. Before the project could begin, TDOT had to acquire additional right-of-way. This was opposed by some residents of the area, delaying the start of the project by several years.

== See also ==
- List of tanker explosions
- Waverly, Tennessee tank car explosion
