= Waverly, Tennessee, tank car explosion =

1978 railway disaster in Tennessee, United States

Waverly, Tennessee tank car explosion

Details
- Date: February 24, 1978
- Location: Waverly, Tennessee; 56.8 mi (91.4 km) west from Nashville
- Coordinates: 36°05′13″N 87°47′31″W
- Country: United States
- Operator: Louisville and Nashville Railroad
- Incident type: Derailment, tank car explosion
- Cause: Tank car boiling liquid expanding vapor explosion (BLEVE) two days following a derailment

Statistics
- Trains: 1
- Vehicles: 15
- Passengers: 0
- Deaths: 16
- Injured: 43
- Damage: $1,800,000, equivalent to $6,257,000 in 2024

On February 22, 1978, twenty-four cars of a 92-car Louisville and Nashville Railroad (L&N) freight train derailed in Waverly, Tennessee. Two of the derailed tank cars contained a total of 30,161 US gallons (114,170 L; 25,114 imp gal) of liquefied petroleum gas (LPG). On February 24, 1978, at approximately 2:58 p.m., one of the tank cars suffered a boiling liquid expanding vapor explosion (BLEVE), killing 16 people and injuring 43 others.

== Derailment ==
At about 10:25 p.m. on February 22, twenty-four cars of a 92-car Louisville and Nashville Railroad (L&N) freight train derailed in the downtown area of Waverly. Local emergency services handled the accident, including inspecting the wreck for signs of hazardous material (hazmat) leaks. The responding team assumed the LPG tank car was a double-wall tank car; however, it was a single-wall car.

=== Response to derailment ===
At 5:10 a.m. on February 23, after a previous miscommunication regarding hazardous material being present, the Tennessee Office of Civil Defense (TOCD, a precursor to the Tennessee Emergency Management Agency or TEMA) sent out a hazmat team to assess the situation. They concurred with the local officials' decision to keep the tank cars cool by spraying them with streams of water, and the decision was made to evacuate a 1/4-mile (0.40 km) area around the derailment zone, with gas and electric service to the area shut off.

Louisville and Nashville wreck crews were beginning to clear debris. The tank car, owned by Union Tank Car Company and numbered UTLX 83013, was buried by debris. Crews removed the wrecked cars, moved UTLX 83013 to clear the tracks, and partially reopened the rail line at about 8 p.m. on February 23. A tanker truck and a crew specializing in LPG cleanup arrived about 1 p.m. on February 24.

== Tank car explodes ==
Temperatures during the previous two days of the incident were from 20 to 30 °F (−7 to −1 °C) and about 1/2 inch (13 mm) of snow was on the ground, but by mid-day on February 24, the temperature had risen to 50–60 °F (10–16 °C) with clear skies and sunshine.

About 20 minutes before the LPG removal was to begin, the area was tested with dedicated gas detection equipment, and no leaks were detected. The Waverly police and fire chiefs were on the scene, and the hazmat crew was moving its equipment to begin the transfer when, at 2:58 p.m., vapor was discovered leaking from the tank car. Before any action could be taken, a boiling liquid expanding vapor explosion (BLEVE) occurred.

The blast was felt for hundreds of feet and seen for miles, and disabled most of the firefighting equipment at the site. One piece of the tank car was launched over 330 feet (100 m), landing in front of a house. The explosion sparked numerous fires in nearby buildings and torched several road vehicles and rail cars.

=== Response to explosion ===
Over the next several hours, over 250 emergency vehicles converged on the blast site, some from as far as Nashville and Memphis. Air ambulances from Fort Campbell Army Post were dispatched to the site, and the worst burn victims were moved to Nashville for initial treatment. A number of these were then transported to burn centers in Louisville, Kentucky, Birmingham, Alabama, and Cincinnati, Ohio late on February 25. The evacuation radius was expanded to 1 mile (1.6 km) in case a second tanker exploded.

By 7:00 pm the fires were under control, and a search for additional casualties began. It was later terminated due to visibility issues, but resumed at 5:30 a.m. on February 25. A car loaded with paper products reignited circa 3:15 p.m., but was quickly extinguished. A second LPG car was emptied by 10:30 p.m. Local residents were allowed to return home at 8:30 a.m. on February 26.

== Aftermath ==
A total of sixteen people died as a result of the blast and the aftermath; six were killed instantly. Among those lost were Waverly's fire chief Wilbur York and police chief Guy Barnett, TOCD state investigator Mark Belyew, members of the L&N wreck crew, and several residents of the area. 43 others were injured to various degrees.

Sixteen structures in Waverly were destroyed, and another 20 were seriously damaged. Both of Waverly's fire trucks were destroyed. In 1979, the total property damage was estimated at $1,800,000, equivalent to $6,257,000 in 2024.

The National Transportation Safety Board (NTSB) blamed the blast on the car itself, as a crack had developed when the car was damaged by the derailment. It is believed that this crack expanded when the car was moved off the tracks, leading to overpressurization in the tank and the single wall failing. The NTSB commended the town of Waverly on its preparedness for such an emergency, but also exposed the need for all people involved in accident cleanups to be trained in how to handle hazardous materials.

The Waverly explosion, along with other accidents involving railroad derailments and hazardous materials (the most infamous being the train derailment in Mississauga, Ontario, Canada on November 10, 1979) resulted in a major rework of how authorities deal with such emergencies. In 1980, Tennessee and the TOCD created a set of standards and the Tennessee Hazardous Materials Institute for the training of hazmat responders, and since the institute's formation, there have been no fatalities among Tennessee emergency responders at hazmat sites.

It was also one of the events that a National Governors Association study says helped push the establishment of the Federal Emergency Management Agency (FEMA), created by President Jimmy Carter's executive order in 1979.

== See also ==
- Memphis tanker truck disaster
