= San Juan Ixhuatepec =

Coordinates: 19°31′08″N 99°06′20″W

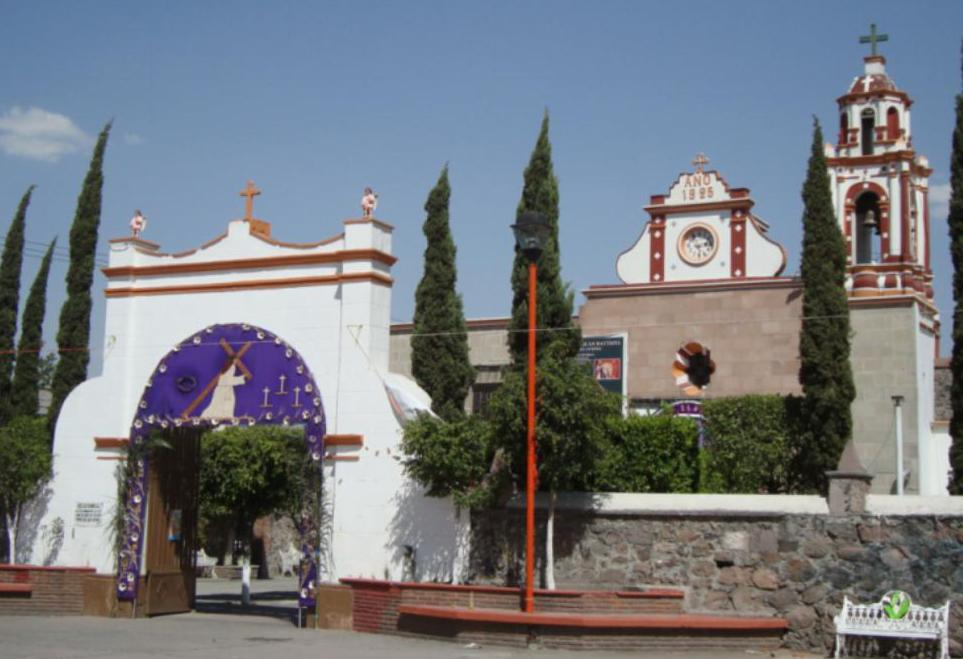
Saint John the Baptist Church, San Juan Ixhuatepec, Tlalnepantla de Baz, México State, México.

San Juan Ixhuatepec is a town located in the municipality of Tlalnepantla de Baz, in the centre of the State of Mexico. The population is 353,300. The name of Ixhuatepec means "place in the leaves hill" in the Nahuatl language.

== San Juanico Disaster ==
The town is known for being the location of the San Juanico disaster which involved a series of fires and explosions of a liquified petroleum gas installation (LPG) belonging to the state-owned oil company Pemex on 19 November 1984, which killed 650 people, and is considered one of the worst industrial disasters in the world.

== See also ==
- San Juanico disaster
