= Tossal d'en Cervera =

- Location within Spain

Highest point
- Elevation: 1,347 m (4,419 ft)
- Coordinates: 40°43′26″N 0°11′50″E

Geography
- Location: Montsià, Catalonia; Baix Maestrat (Valencian Community)
- Parent range: Ports de Tortosa-Beseit

Geology
- Mountain type: Karstic

Climbing
- First ascent: unknown
- Easiest route: hike from the vicinity of Ulldecona Reservoir

Tossal d'en Cervera (Valencian pronunciation: [toˈsal den seɾˈveɾa]) or Pic de Cervera is a mountain in Spain. It is located between the municipal terms of La Sénia, in the Montsià comarca, and La Pobla de Benifassà, Baix Maestrat, Valencian Community.

This mountain has an elevation of 1,347.5 metres above sea level. The abandoned hamlet of Refalgarí (Rafalgarí) lies on its northern slope.

This mountain is part of the Ports de Tortosa-Beseit system and should not be confused with the Cervera Mountains located further southeast.

== See also ==
- Ports de Tortosa-Beseit
- Mountains of Catalonia
- Mountains of the Valencian Community
- Iberian System
