= Jorge Palatsí =

Spanish footballer

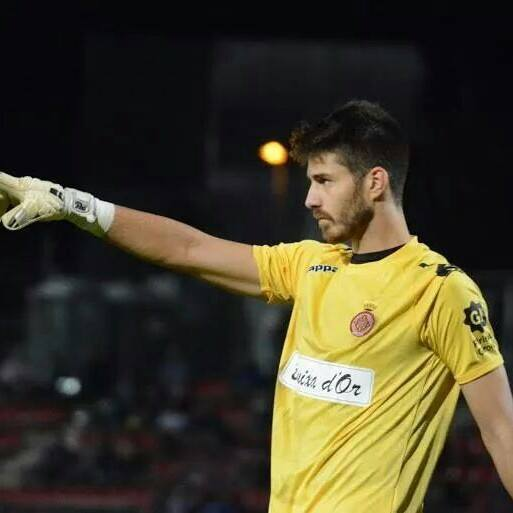
- Palatsí in 2015

Personal information
- Full name: Jorge Palatsí Gallego
- Date of birth: 18 February 1988 (age 38)
- Place of birth: La Salzadella, Spain
- Height: 1.88 m (6 ft 2 in)
- Position: Goalkeeper

Youth career
- Racing Club Salsadella
- Sant Mateu
- Villarreal
- Benicarló

Senior career*
Years	Team	Apps	(Gls)
2007–2008	Traiguera	29	(0)
2008–2010	Benlloch	48	(0)
2010–2011	Villarreal C	23	(0)
2011–2013	Villarreal B	25	(0)
2012–2013	Villarreal	1	(0)
2013–2015	Girona	2	(0)
2016–2019	Cultural Leonesa	91	(0)
2019–2020	Burgos	17	(0)
Total		236	(0)
- * Club domestic league appearances and goals

Jorge Palatsí Gallego (born 18 February 1988 in La Salzadella, Baix Maestrat, Valencian Community) is a Spanish former professional footballer who played as a goalkeeper.

== Honours ==
Cultural Leonesa

- Segunda División B: 2016–17
