= Monastery of Santa María de Benifassà =

Cistercian monastery in Puebla de Benifasar, Castellon, Spain

- Monasterio de Santa María (Puebla de Benifasar)
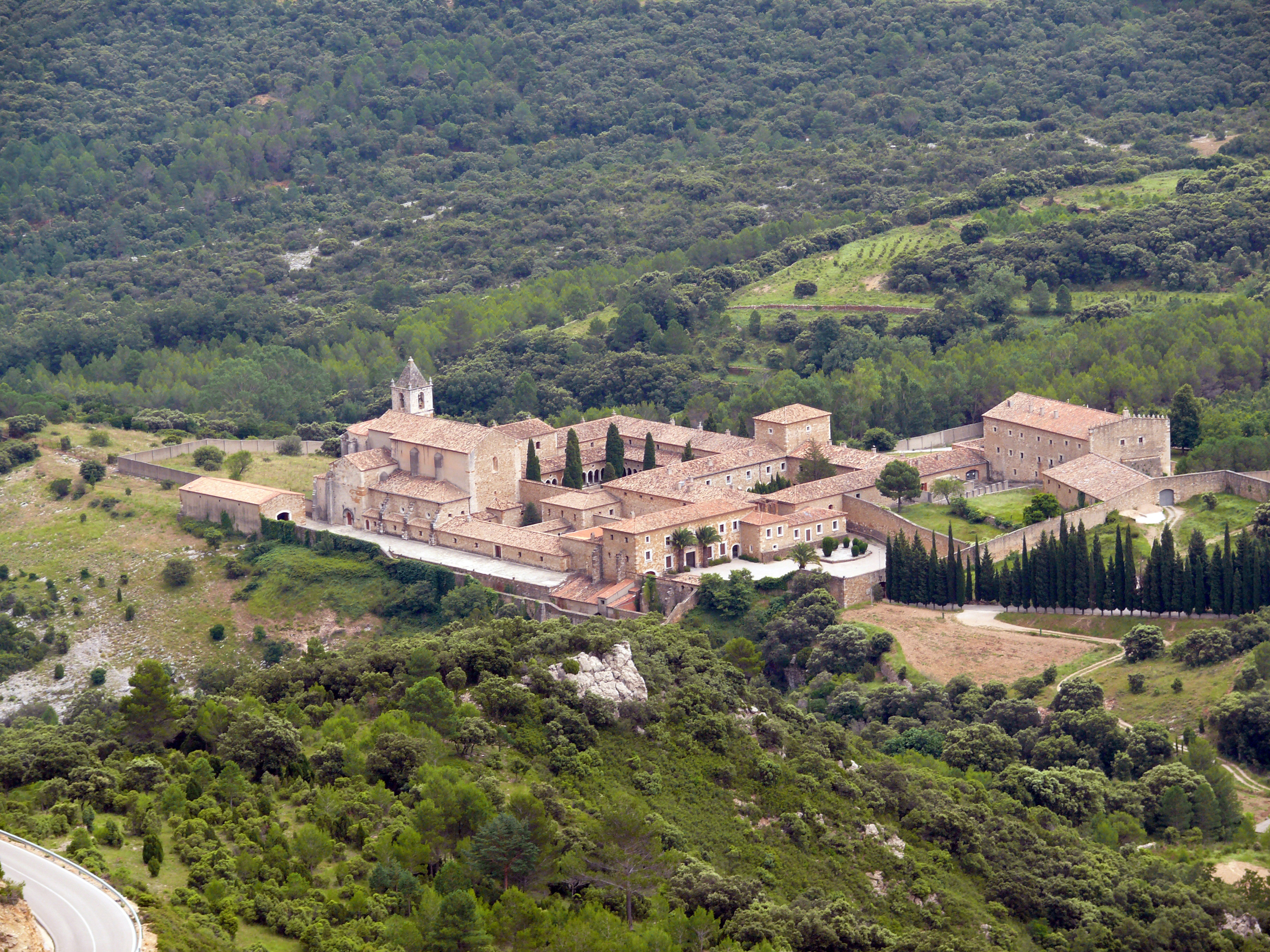
- General view of the monastery
- Interactive map of the Monastery of Santa María de Benifassà area

General information
- Type: Cistercian monastery (active)
- Architectural style: Gothic, late Romanesque
- Location: Spain Puebla de Benifasar, Castellon, Spain
- Coordinates: 40°40′35″N 0°11′54″E

Design and construction
- Designations: National Historic-Artistic Monument (1931)

The Monastery of Santa María de Benifassà, also known as the Charterhouse of Santa María, is a Cistercian monastery located in the municipality of Puebla de Benifasar, in the Province of Castellón, Spain. Situated to the northeast of the hill of Santa Escolastica, it is a Gothic building constructed in the 13th century, with additions from the 14th, 15th and 16th centuries. It was declared a National Historic-Artistic Monument in 1931. It is considered the first Cistercian foundation in the Kingdom of Valencia and one of the oldest monumental complexes in the Valencian Community.

Since 1967, the monastery has been occupied by a cloistered community of Carthusian nuns of the Order of Saint Bruno, the only community of this kind in Spain. Only the church is open to visitors.

== History ==
During the period of Muslim rule, life in the area developed around the Arab castle of Beni-Hassan. The castle was conquered by Alfonso II of Aragon in 1195, and later recaptured by the Muslims before being taken again by Peter II of Aragon, who donated it to Guillem de Cervera in 1208 with the aim of repopulating the territory.

In 1229, Guillem de Cervera took the habit at the Cistercian monastery of Poblet and donated his lands to the Cistercian Order. In 1233, James I of Aragon confirmed the donation and ordered the construction of a monastery dedicated to Santa Maria, sending twelve monks from Poblet to establish the new community. The monks initially settled in the old Islamic castle, building a small chapel dedicated to Santa Escolastica, before moving to the new monastery buildings in 1250.

From its foundation in 1233 until the Mendizabal confiscations of 1835, the monastery served as the feudal lord of the surrounding villages, a territory known as the Tinença de Benifassà. The abbot exercised territorial authority over the area for several centuries, and the monastery's influence shaped the economic and commercial life of the region, including the construction of granaries and mills for the monastery's use.

The monastery suffered damage during several conflicts. During the War of the Reapers (17th century), the people of the Tinença de Benifassa rose up against abuses under the rule of Charles I. During the War of the Spanish Succession (18th century), the monks supported the Archduke of Austria. The Napoleonic occupation (1808-1814) brought further damage: the monastery was sacked, used as a prison and as a hospital, and important works were lost, including a manuscript of the Els Furs.

After the Mendizabal confiscations of 1835, the monastery lost its religious character and fell into disrepair, passing through the hands of several owners. It was declared a National Monument in 1931 and became the property of the Diputacion de Castellon, which carried out restoration works. In 1967 it recovered its religious function when it was occupied by Carthusian nuns.

== Description ==
The monastery is a walled enclosure containing buildings from different periods spanning the 13th to 18th centuries. It was built following the model of Poblet monastery, though on a smaller scale. The complex combines late Romanesque elements, visible in some doorways, transverse arches and decorative capitals, with Gothic elements in the columns of the cloister, the structure of the church and the main cloister.

The fortifications, including the perimeter wall and central tower, date from 1250. The remaining buildings were constructed between 1264 and 1276.

The main access is on the south-facing wing through the Royal Gate, which retains Romanesque features including a chequerboard decoration on the impost of the great arch. This gate is flanked by the abbot's residential quarters, the royal quarters, the hospice and the chapel. Beyond the gate lies a large courtyard, to the left of which are various rooms and smaller cloisters with dormitories. Near the entrance is a small cloister containing a square two-storey tower: the lower section, more robust and solid, has a pointed arch on each side, while the upper section has double arches with paired columns at the corners.

The main cloister is located to the right of the entrance. It has a continuous podium from which paired columns alternate with pillars supporting pointed arches with double moulding on the intrados. The capitals and impost lines are decorated with plant motifs and rosettes, combined with figurative and animal motifs. Above the arches are oculi that provide lighting to the galleries. Under the direction of Pedro Torres, the abbot's palace and cloister were built between 1316 and 1347. One wing of the cloister contains the kitchen, refectory and other rooms. Another contains the old sacristy and the chapter house, the latter built in the early 14th century. The chapter house has a rectangular floor plan divided into two bays by an arch resting on corbels, accessed through a trefoil ogival doorway flanked by twin windows with four-lobed oculi, and covered with a ribbed vault.

=== Church ===
The church runs parallel to the cloister. Construction began in 1264 and it has a single nave with a transept and polygonal apse, built between 1264 and 1276. The nave was completed in 1460 according to plans by master Barcelo de Vallibona. Inside, columns attached to the walls support pointed arch formers. The vault is ribbed in the nave, the crossing and the transept arms, and the apse has a ribbed vault. The church has ogival windows with the reduced lighting typical of Cistercian architecture. The side chapels and transept chapels are housed in independent structures projecting outward from the building.

In the central nave stand two notable works by sculptor Lluis M. Saumells Panades: a monumental Christ carving measuring 2.20 metres in height and an image of Our Lady of Benifaca. The exterior roof of the nave is pitched. The bell tower is situated between the apse and the transept on the epistle side. Its lower section is Gothic, while the upper two sections and the pyramidal top were added in 1672. The building is constructed in carved stone on the exterior walls and in most interior elements. Decoration is limited to capitals and imposts, with predominantly plant motifs, though animal themes also appear, along with arches, abbatial shields and 17th-century doorways.
