= Joan Todó Cortiella =

Spanish writer

- Born: 2 April 1977 (age 49); La Sénia, Montsià, Catalonia, Spain
- Occupations: Writer and poet

Joan Todó Cortiella (La Sénia, 2 April 1977) is a Catalan poet and writer. He studied Comparative Literature and Literary Theory in Barcelona.

After completing his studies, he undertook his literary career in Barcelona. There he lived until late 2011, when he returned to La Sénia to labor issues. From his experience in the Catalan capital emerges her first collection of poems, Los fòssils (al ras) and also his first book narrative, A butxacades. Later also published El fàstic que us cega, another poetry collection.

His last work, L'horitzó primer, talks about his hometown and comes from a commission of eleven short stories the magazine L'Avenç. It is inspired in books of Gaziel i Artur Bladé, who also write on theirs hometowns.

He has also collaborated on several literary magazines, such as Paper de Vidre, Quadern, Pèl Capell, El Tacte que té, Reduccions, Caràcters i L'Avenç.

== Published work ==
- Los fòssils (al ras). Cornellà: La Breu edicions, 2007, p. 53 (Alabatre, 5). ISBN 978-84935391-1-5.
- A butxacades. Cornellà: La Breu edicions, 2011, p. 166 (Colecció_ Cicuta, 1). ISBN 978-84-937976-7-6.
- El fàstic que us cega. Cornellà: La Breu edicions, 2012, p. 80 (Alabatre, 39). ISBN 978-84-939632-6-2.
- L'horitzó primer. L'Avenç, 2013, p. 184 (Els Llibres de L'Avenç). ISBN 978-84-88839-73-2.
