= Serra de Sant Pere =

Mountain range in the Valencian Community

- Serra del Solà
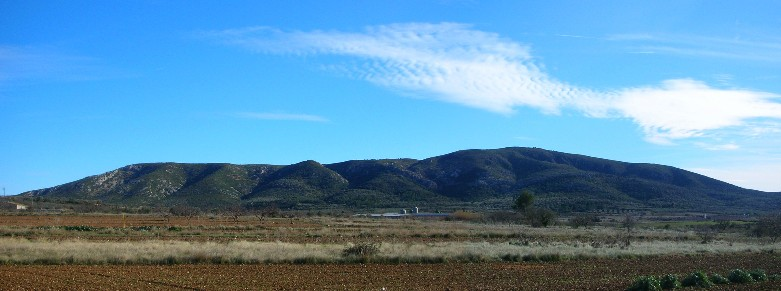

Highest point
- Peak: Tossal de Sant Pere
- Elevation: 541 m (1,775 ft)
- Listing: Mountains of the Valencian Community
- Coordinates: 40°32′25″N 0°16′11″E

Geography
- Location within Spain
- Location: Baix Maestrat, Valencian Community
- Parent range: Iberian System Eastern zone / Mediterranean System, Southern zone

Geology
- Orogeny: Alpine orogeny
- Rock type: Karstic

Climbing
- Easiest route: Straight to the Tossal de Sant Pere hiking from Traiguera or along the ridge from Canet lo Roig

Serra de Sant Pere (Saint Peter's Range) (Valencian pronunciation: [ˈsɛra ðe ˈsam ˈpeɾe], Spanish: Sierra del Solá) or Serra del Solà is a 5.8 km (4 mi) long mountain range in the Baix Maestrat comarca, Valencian Community, Spain. Its highest point is Tossal de Sant Pere (541 m). The slopes are covered in low Mediterranean vegetation

== Location ==
This moderately high mountain chain rises west of Traiguera and east of Canet lo Roig, in the transitional zone between the Mediterranean and the continental climate. It is part of the transitional area between the Iberian System and the Mediterranean System of mountains. Unlike the nearby Cervera Mountains, the summits are rarely covered in snow in the winter.

There is a ruined church building formerly dedicated to Saint Peter the Apostle close to the top of the highest peak, as well as a cave with steps. Ancient Iberian remains and steles have been found in the lower slopes of the western side of the range.

Hiking paths are well marked and there is a triangulation pillar as well as a disused, rusting antenna on the highest summit.

== See also ==
- Maestrat/Maestrazgo
- Mountains of the Valencian Community
