= Rossell, Castellón =

Rossell
- Municipality
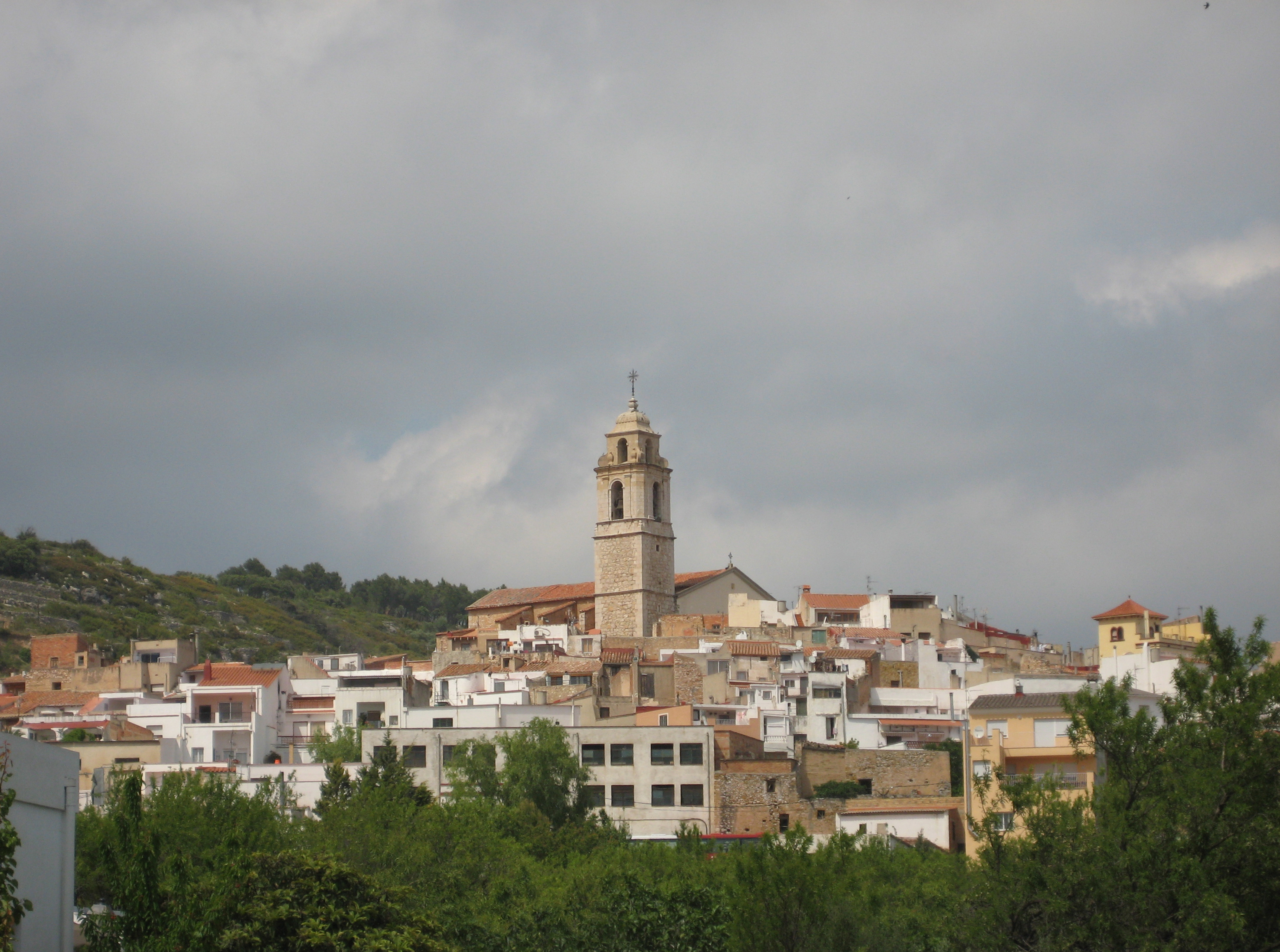

- Coat of arms

- Location in Spain
- Coordinates: 40°37′07″N 0°13′26″E
- Country: Spain
- Autonomous community: Valencian Community
- Province: Castellón
- Comarca: Baix Maestrat
- Judicial district: Vinaròs

Area
  - Total: 74.9 km^{2} (28.9 sq mi)
- Elevation: 471 m (1,545 ft)

Population (2025-01-01)
  - Total: 910
  - Density: 12/km^{2} (31/sq mi)
- Demonym(s): Rossellà, rossellana
- Time zone: UTC+1 (CET)
  - Summer (DST): UTC+2 (CEST)
- Postal code: 12511
- Official language(s): Valencian

Rossell (Valencian pronunciation: [roˈseʎ]) is a municipality in the comarca of Baix Maestrat in the Valencian Community, Spain.

The town is located at the eastern end of the Ports de Tortosa-Beseit, in the area known as Muntanyes de Benifassà. Rossell is part of the Taula del Sénia free association of municipalities.

== Villages ==
- Bel, aggregated in 1972 and located in the Tinença de Benifassà, 0 inhab. (People come only on weekends or holidays). A lot of people come during local festivals.
- Les Cases del Riu, close to La Sénia, 70
