= Benicarló =

- Town and municipality
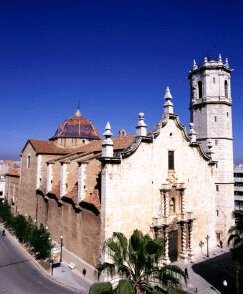
- Church of Sant Bartolomeu.

- Coat of arms

- Location in Spain Benicarló (Valencian Community) Benicarló (Spain)
- Coordinates: 40°25′N 0°25′E
- Country: Spain
- Autonomous community: Valencian Community
- Province: Castellón
- Comarca: Baix Maestrat

Government
  - Alcaldessa (Mayoress): Xaro Miralles (PSPV-PSOE)

Area
  - Total: 47.9 km^{2} (18.5 sq mi)
- Elevation: 21 m (69 ft)

Population (2025-01-01)
  - Total: 30,296
  - Density: 632/km^{2} (1,640/sq mi)
- Demonyms: • benicarlando, -a (Val.) • benicarlando/a (Sp.)
- Official language(s): Valencian; Spanish
- Linguistic area: Valencian
- Time zone: UTC+1 (CET)
  - Summer (DST): UTC+2 (CEST)
- Postal code: 12580
- Website: Official website

Benicarló (Note: Pronunciation of Benicarló: Valencian: [benikaɾˈlo] Spanish: [benikaɾˈlo]) is a town and municipality in Spain, in the Valencian Community, in the Baix Maestrat region, of which it is the second largest by population. It borders Vinaròs, Càlig and Peniscola, as well as the Mediterranean Sea.

== Geography ==
Located on the shores of the Mediterranean Sea, the municipality is located on a plain with orographic features of little relief, such as the Puig de la Nau (166 m), on the northern boundary of the municipality, and the Tossa (168 m). The rivers of the municipality have a perpendicular course to the coast: the Aiguaoliva to the north, the Rambla de Cervera (Riú Sec), in the center, and the Alcalà (Barranquet) to the south. It has the beaches: Mar Xica, Morrongo, Gurugú and Caracola.

== History ==
=== Iberian settlements ===
There are several places that either were inhabited or had a relationship with the Iberian population. The most important set is the Village of the Puig de la Nau, located at the foot of the hill of the same name. It is a site that has six phases of occupation, between 700 and 400 BC, of which part of the urban structure is preserved. The excavations found the Kylix of Penthesilea, an Attic cup, or the tresoret, a group of ornamental utensils. Currently, the findings are divided between museums in Castellón de la Plana and the Mucbe, located in Benicarló.

At the foot of Puig de la Nau was the necropolis of the settlement, where several funerary remains were found. In addition, in the sea and at the mouth of the Riu Sec, an enclave known as Les Pedres de la Barbada, there is a submarine site, corresponding to the ancient Iberian port.

The Puig de la Nau village was abandoned due to the decline of trade with the Greeks and Punics. In the following century, a new village was established on the hill of La Tossa, today between the municipalities of Benicarló and Càlig, which was also later depopulated.

Although in the past the toponym Hystria (country of vineyards, named in the Maritime Ora of Rufius Festus Avienius) was attributed to the Village of Benicarló, this hypothesis is rejected today, as is the existence of a continuum between the Iberian and Muslim populations of the Middle Ages: after the depopulation of La Tossa, the current municipal area would have been occupied by modest Hispano-Roman estates.

=== The Muslim farmhouse ===
The first reference to the present-day Benicarló appears with the Arab farmhouse of Beni-Gazló or Bani-Gazlun. The scarcity of remains and documentary sources only allow us to sketch this enclave. It would be a small urban area, surrounded by a palisade, with a watchtower and a place for prayer, surrounded by farmland, which developed thanks to the Arab technology of using well water. It would possibly be located around the current Carrer Ample.

This farmhouse remained under the protection of the Peniscola Castle, where the inhabitants took refuge in case of fights with the christians. In one of these, around 1225, in a first attempt by James I of Aragon to conquer the fortified city, it was depopulated. During the two-month siege of Peníscola, the monarch even spent the night in the farmhouse. Finally, on June 14, 1236, it passed definitively into Christian hands after the municipal charter was granted to thirty settlers, under the jurisdiction of Zaragoza. The toponym changed to Benicastló.

On the other hand, by the sea, there has been a fishing district formed by Christians, coming from the Tortosa area, since approximately the 11th century, who were also under the rule of the Muslim castle of Peñíscola.

=== Middle Ages ===
The reconquered site of Benicastló remained under the jurisdiction of the castle of Peñíscola. On August 16, 1246, it was granted the operation of a blacksmith shop and a bread oven. In 1294, it became part of the Knights Templar' territory and later, in 1319, of the Order of Montesa, when a period of unprecedented economic and social growth began. In 1326, through the issuance of the Carta del Bovalar the term was expanded. In 1359, the process of segregation of Peñíscola began, thanks to the concession of the Master of Montesa, Pere de Thous.

In 1370 Peter IV of Aragon (1319-1387) granted it the right to embark and disembark goods from its beaches without contribution or payments.

=== Modern Age ===
On 12 July 1490 Ferdinand II of Aragon (1452-1516) exempted Benicarló from contributing to Peñíscola. During the Revolt of the Brotherhoods, the town was loyal to the king and the Order of Montesa, for which it was besieged by the agermanats in 1521. This action served them to obtain the title of town (20 October 1523) and other privileges regarding the import of wheat and the celebration of the annual fair for Saint Bartholomew. In 1556 it was attacked by the Turks. Also in the 16th century, the chronicler Martí de Viciana highlights the agricultural wealth of the town, with a term full of Norias, and a community of Franciscan friars settled there.

In the mid-17th century, Benicarló, like other towns in the area, suffered the effects of the Black Death, which caused more than 500 deaths. The crisis was exacerbated by an epidemic that devastated the fields, destroying most of the vineyards. The beginning of the 18th century was marked by the War of the Spanish Succession, in which the town surrendered to General Asfeld (1706). As a result of the war, the medieval walls of the town were dismantled, using the stones for the later Church of Sant Bartholomew.

=== Contemporary age ===
In the Peninsular War he resisted the attacks of Suchet (1770-1826) on August 14, 1810 and actively participated in the formation of guerrillas. In the Carlist Wars it was attacked by Serrador in 1835 and 1837 and by Cabrera in a bloody battle on January 23, 1838, in which the Carlists took control of the population for a couple of years.

In the 19th century, the production of Carlon wine, which was exported, especially to Argentina, France and England, gave a significant boost to the local economy; to meet the enormous demand, the Companyia del Port (Port Company) was formed in 1883, and construction began in 1886.

At the beginning of the 20th century, the phylloxera put an end to the cultivation of the vine. On October 22, 1926, Alfonso XIII granted the title of city. Spectacular growth began in 1930. Between 1931-1944, the current port was built, completing what had been started in the previous century.

During the Spanish Civil War, the population suffered from bombing by Franco's aviation. In the 1960s, Benicarló became a receiving center for immigrants (for the period 1962-1967 the number exceeded 350 per year), attracted by industry and tourism. Since the end of the 18th century the demographic line has been ascending with a slight stop due to the agricultural crisis at the beginning of the 20th century.

== Population ==
In 1794 there were 1,300 residents and in 1877, 2,182 residents. This growth stopped between 1900-1930 due to the vineyard crisis, but continued from 1930 onwards.

Demographic evolution in recent years Register of inhabitants
Year	2011	2012	2013	2014	2015	2016	2017	2018	2019	2020	2021	2022	2023	2024
Population	26,553	26,667	26,491	26,521	26,403	26,486	26,429	26,744	26,912	27,363	27,658	27,780	28,681	29,751

== Politics and government ==
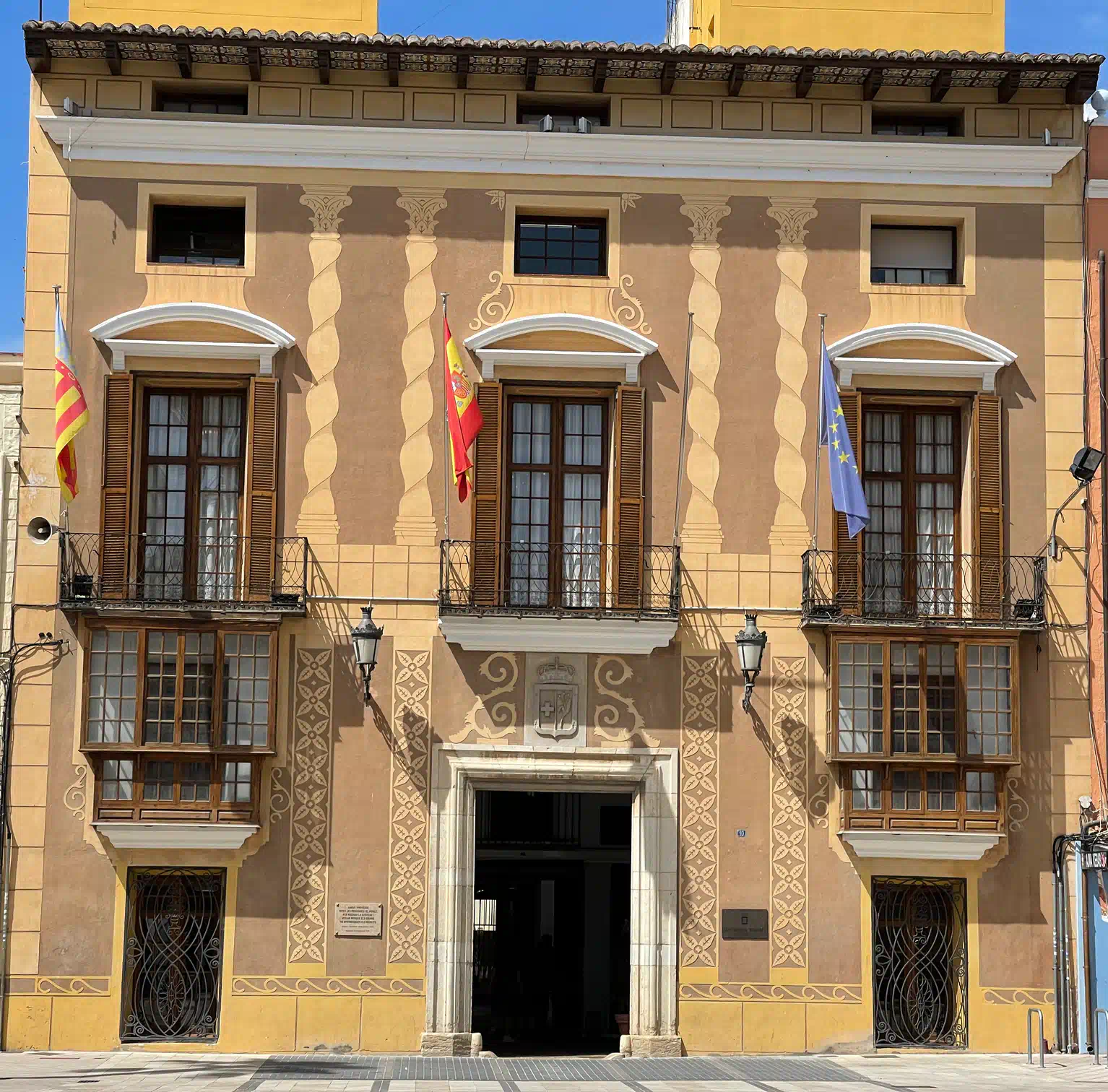
Casa de la Baronessa, headquarters of the City Council.

=== Composition of the City Council ===
The Plenary of the City Council is made up of 21 councillors. In the 2023 Spanish local elections, 7 councillors were elected from the People's Party (PP), 5 from the Spanish Socialist Workers' Party (PSPV-PSOE), 4 from Benigazlum (BG), 3 from Compromís per Benicarló: acord per guanyar (Compromís) and 2 from Vox (Vox).

=== Mayors ===
Since 2023 the mayor of Benicarló is Juan Manuel Cerdá Tena of the People's Party.

== Economy ==
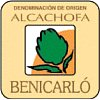
Logo of the Designation of Origin of the artichoke

=== Agriculture ===
Benicarló is an immense garden, where irrigation prevails over dry land. The main agricultural products harvested, in order of importance, are lettuce, tomatoes, artichokes, citrus fruits, beets, and olives.

Special mention should be made of the Artichoke (Cynara scolymus) which is cultivated in the municipality with its own Designation of Origin, which reflects the good quality of the products of Benicarló.

Additionally, fishing is a notable sector of Benicarló's economy. Its fleet of more than 50 vessels has, in recent years, recorded average annual catches of approximately 1,500,000 kilograms of various marine species, including hake, octopus, monkfish, swordfish, and prawns.

=== Industry ===
The furniture industry and chemical essence distilleries have experienced a great boom in recent years.

Benicarló has numerous companies dedicated to the manufacturing of furniture and accessories. The influence of the furniture sector on the productive fabric of the town is reflected by an AIDIMA (Technological Institute of Wood and Related Industries) branch in Benicarló, which is integrated into the network of technological institutes of IMPIVA (Institute of Small and Medium-sized Industrial Enterprises of Valencia).

Much of the industrial activities are located in the Collet Industrial Estate.

=== Commerce ===
Benicarló contains a variety of traditional establishments of all types. The city center area hosts a large number of commercial activities and services.

The Municipal Market of Benicarló, with around 40 stalls, offers its fresh quality products throughout the region, also opening in the afternoons to adapt to the needs of consumers.

There is a shopping center on the N-340a with a Family Cash hypermarket, numerous commercial spaces, a restaurant area, multiplex cinemas and recreational areas.

== Transport ==
Benicarló is crossed by two high-capacity roads that follow the coast:

- The N-340 runs a few kilometers from the town center.
- The AP-7 highway, about 4-5 kilometers from the town center. It has a service area within the municipality. Coming from the north, take exit 42 (Vinaròs-Ulldecona), and coming from the south, exit 43 (Peníscola-Benicarló).

In addition, there are two regional roads, the CV-135 that connects with Càlig and Cervera del Maestrat, and the CV-1406 that connects with Peñíscola.

The railway that connects Valencia and Barcelona crosses the municipality. One and a half kilometers from the city center is the Benicarló-Peníscola Station, with stops for regional trains (direction Castellón de la Plana and Tortosa) and long-distance trains (Alaris and Arco).

== Culture ==
=== Cinema ===
The city of Benicarló has been linked to the world of cinema throughout the last century. In 1956, part of the production La vida es maravillosa (Life is Wonderful) was filmed in the area, directed by Pedro Lazaga.

In the 1980s, the Benicarló Film Festival began, which later moved to the neighboring city of Peñíscola.

=== Book publishing ===
Onada Edicions is a publishing house which has as its fundamental objective the dissemination of natural and cultural heritage, as well as the promotion of literary creation and thought. With more of six hundred published works, its space of action is the entire linguistic field, especially the counties near the Sènia river: Maestrazgo, Els Ports and Terres de l'Ebre. Its promoters are Miquel Àngel Pradilla, professor at the University of Rovira i Virgili, and Ramon París Peñaranda, linguist, teacher specialized in Humanities and expert in toponymy.

=== Music ===
- Associació Musical Ciutat de Benicarló

The origin of the Music Band dates back to the beginning of the 1840s, as indicated by municipal and ecclesiastical documents and archives. In the 1870s there were up to three bands in Benicarló, each linked to different political sectors.

Throughout history it has had several names: La Primitiva, La Lira (1878), Banda Municipal (1927), Agrupación Musical Santa Cecilia (1965) and, since 1976, Associació Musical Ciutat de Benicarló. That year, statutes were created and the band joined the Federation of Musical Societies of the Valencian Community, and musicians of both sexes were integrated on equal terms.

Its directors have been José Ballester, Francisco Coscollano, José Coll, Alejandro Llopis, Francisco Arnau, Antonio Ciurana, José Peris, Bautista Ciurana, José Ferrer, Pascual Boix, Jaime Arnau, José María Palau, Vicente Feliu i Roig, José Ramón Arnau, Joaquín Muñoz, José Antonio Valls, Agustín Lucas, Isabel Costes, José Eleuterio Castelló, Jaime Rebollar and Pablo Anglés.

The band has performed in cities such as Zaragoza, Valencia, Castelló de la Plana, Valladolid, Tortosa, Amposta, Vilanova i la Geltrú, Rubí, Alcañiz, Lleida, Tarragona, Figueres, Cornellà, Calanda, El Prat de Llobregat, Carballedo (Galicia), Calella and numerous Valencian towns. In 1990 and 2002 it performed different performances in the French region of Sarthe, in 1996 in the Italian region of Brianza-Lombardy and in 2007 on the island of Sardinia. In 2001 it performed at the Disneyland Paris park. In 2009, it was invited by the Valencià Institute of Music to perform at the Palau de les Arts Reina Sofia in Valencia, the Teatre Principal d'Alacant and the Auditorium in Castellón de la Plana.

== Main sights ==
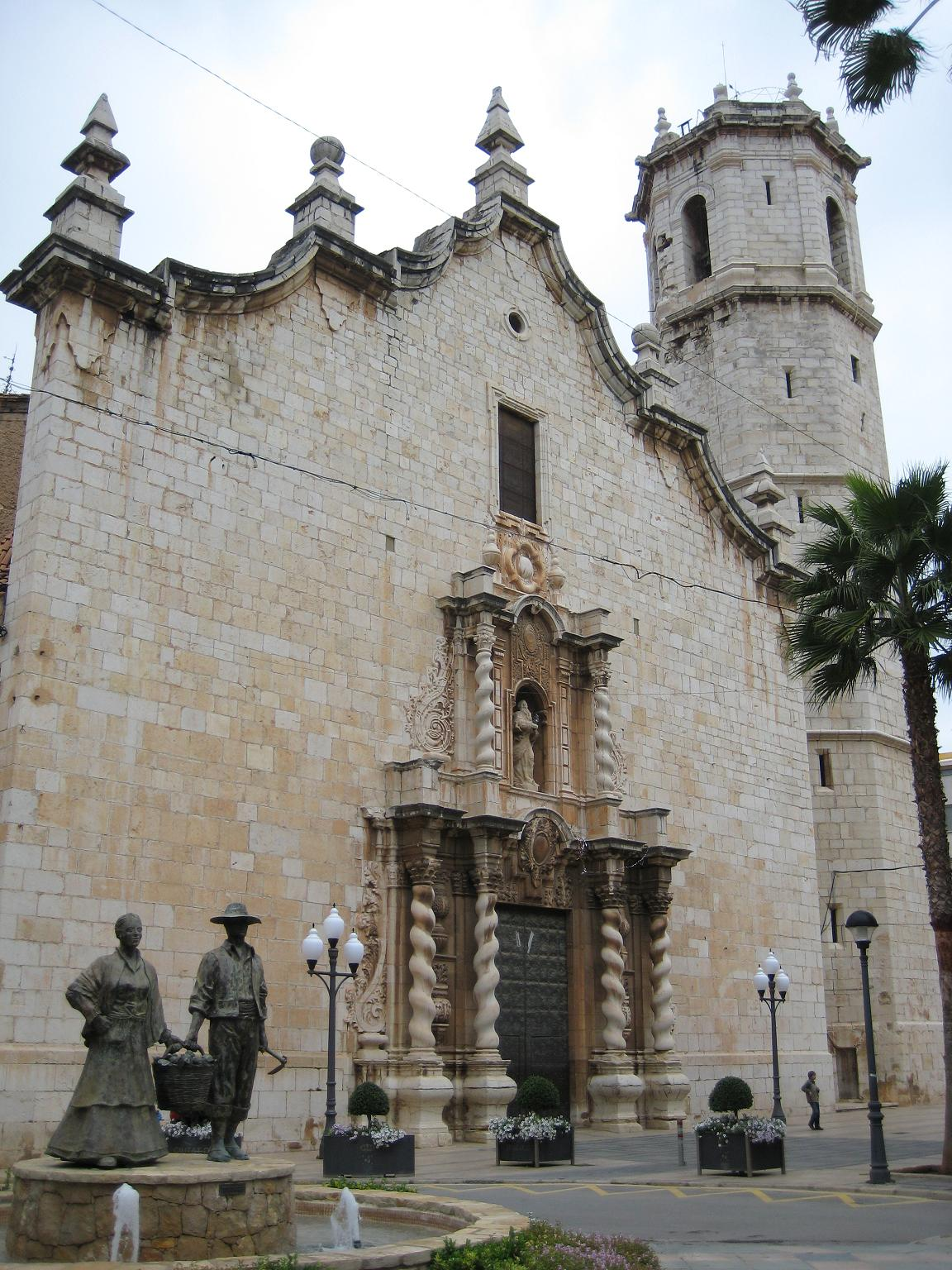
Church of Saint Bartholomew

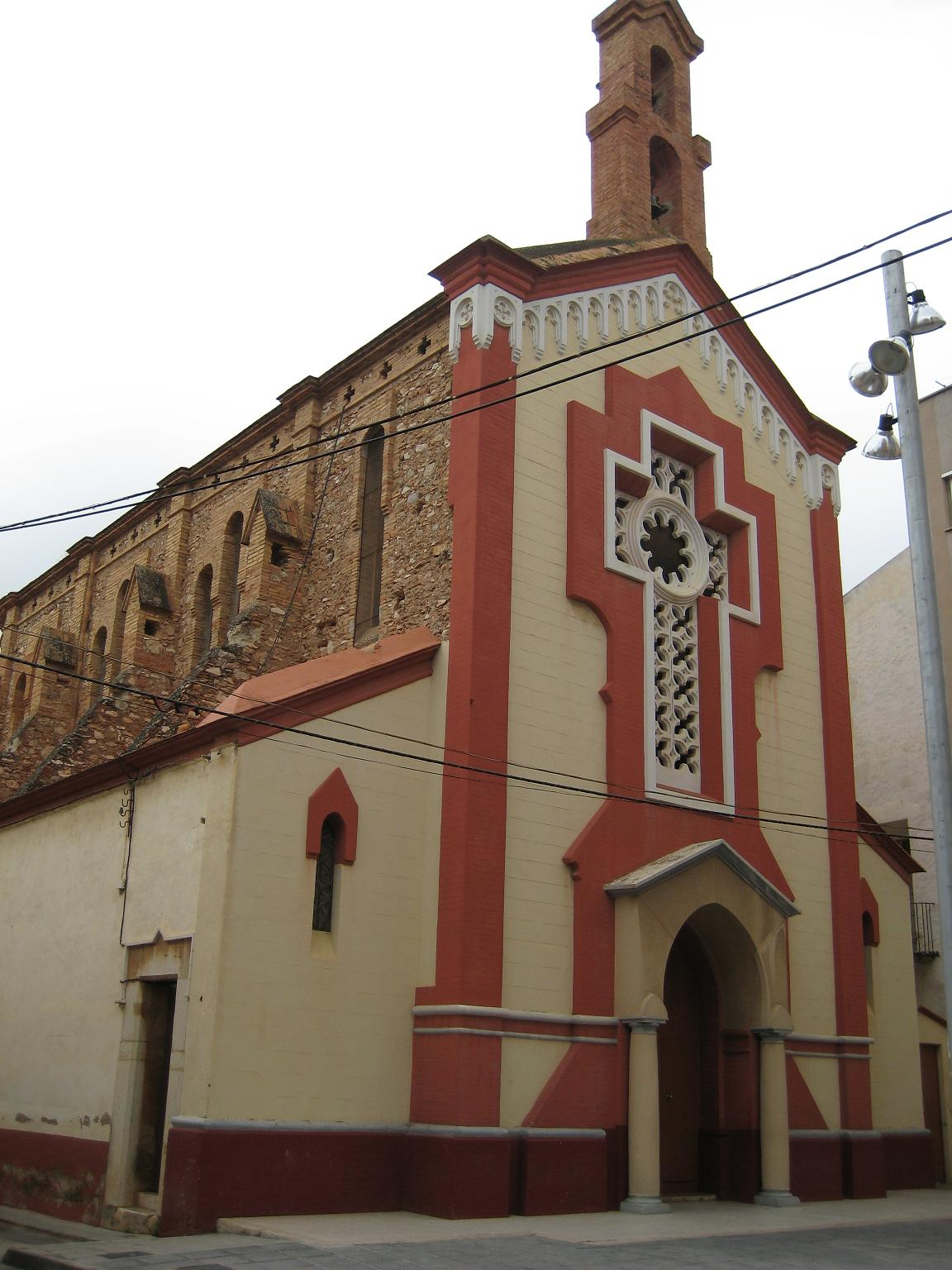
Chapel of Holy Christ of the Sea

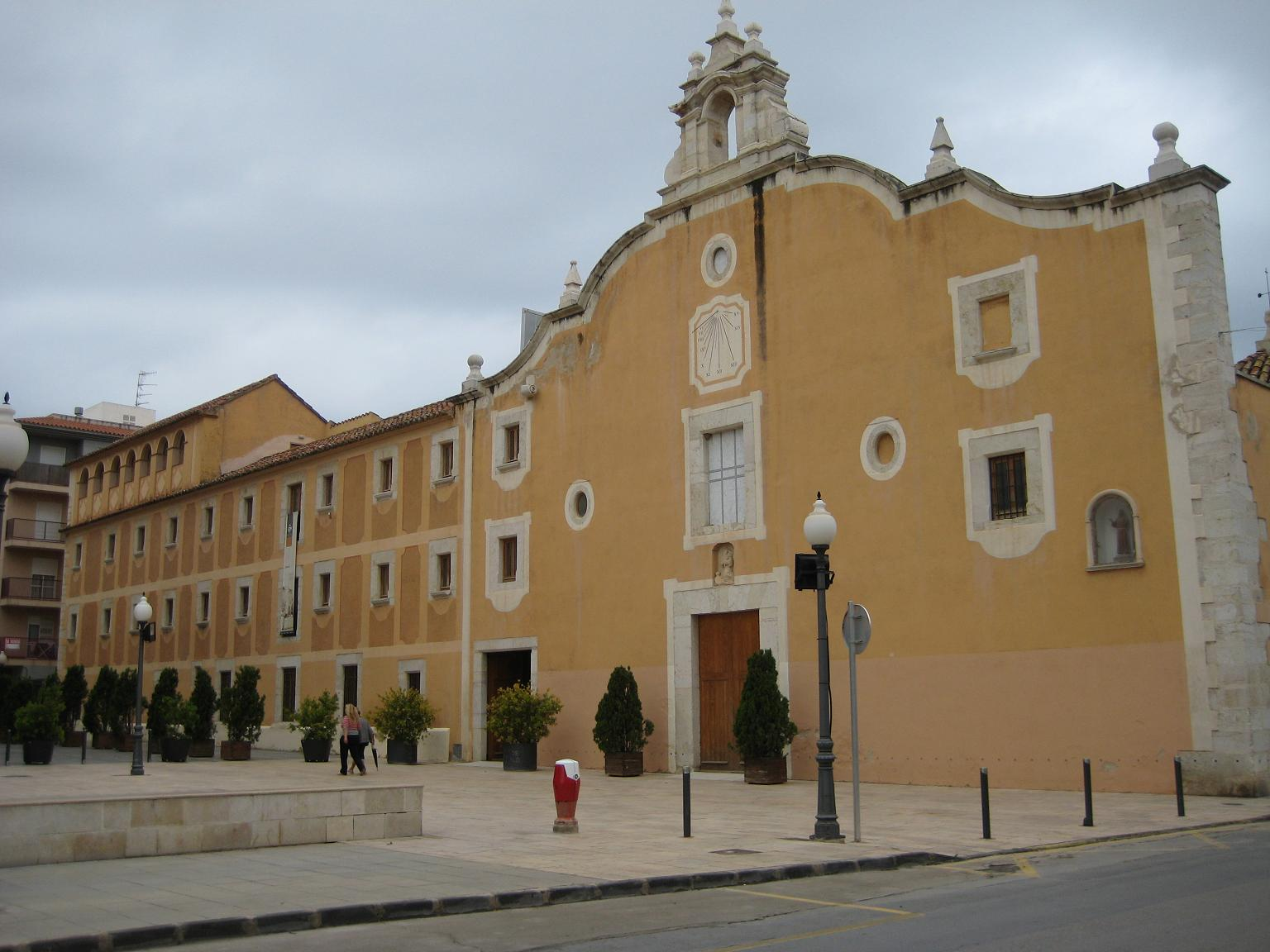
Convent of Saint Francis

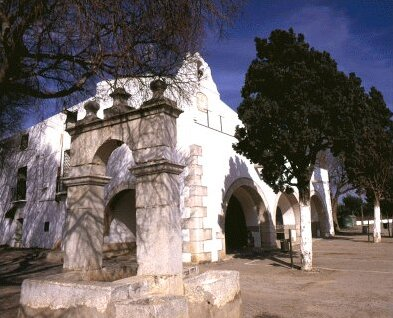
Hermitage of Saint Gregory

- Parish church of Saint Bartholomew. From the 18th century. With a Baroque façade and octagonal bell tower. The large baroque façade is made of stone and frames the façade. It has two bodies: the upper one formed by a large niche with the image of the saint that is topped by two Solomonic columns. The interior of the temple is a single nave with a transept and chapels between the buttresses; a large dome rises above the transept. The altarpiece of the Virgin of Remei is a painting with the Virgin and Child seated on a throne, surrounded by different saints. This work of art is attributed to the artist Vicent Macip. The bell tower is slender, octagonal and freestanding, built with large blocks of carved stone from the country; it has four bodies, the first three very solid, and the fourth with a stylized semicircular window on each side, where the bells are installed.
- Chapel of Holy Christ of the Sea. (Church of Saint Peter) from 1924 located near the Port; this Christ has always been the object of deep devotion in Benicarló. Legend has it that in 1650 a boat arrived on the beaches of Benicarló from which Cèsar Cataldo disembarked carrying an image of Christ on the Cross; Its arrival was described as prodigious and the miracles that the Holy Image worked even more so.
- Convent of St. Francis. From the 18th century. The church, although renovated in the 18th century, retains the original structure of the 16th century; it has a single nave, without side chapels, has a cloister of austere and simple construction, and the facade is topped by a broken-line cornice, with a stone belfry as a top.
- Hermitage of Saint Gregory. From the 17th century. The image of the saint is a polychrome carving from the 16th century. The hermitage has a wide portico formed by five arches of carved stone. On May 9, the saint's feast day, a traditional and popular pilgrimage with a procession to this hermitage is celebrated.

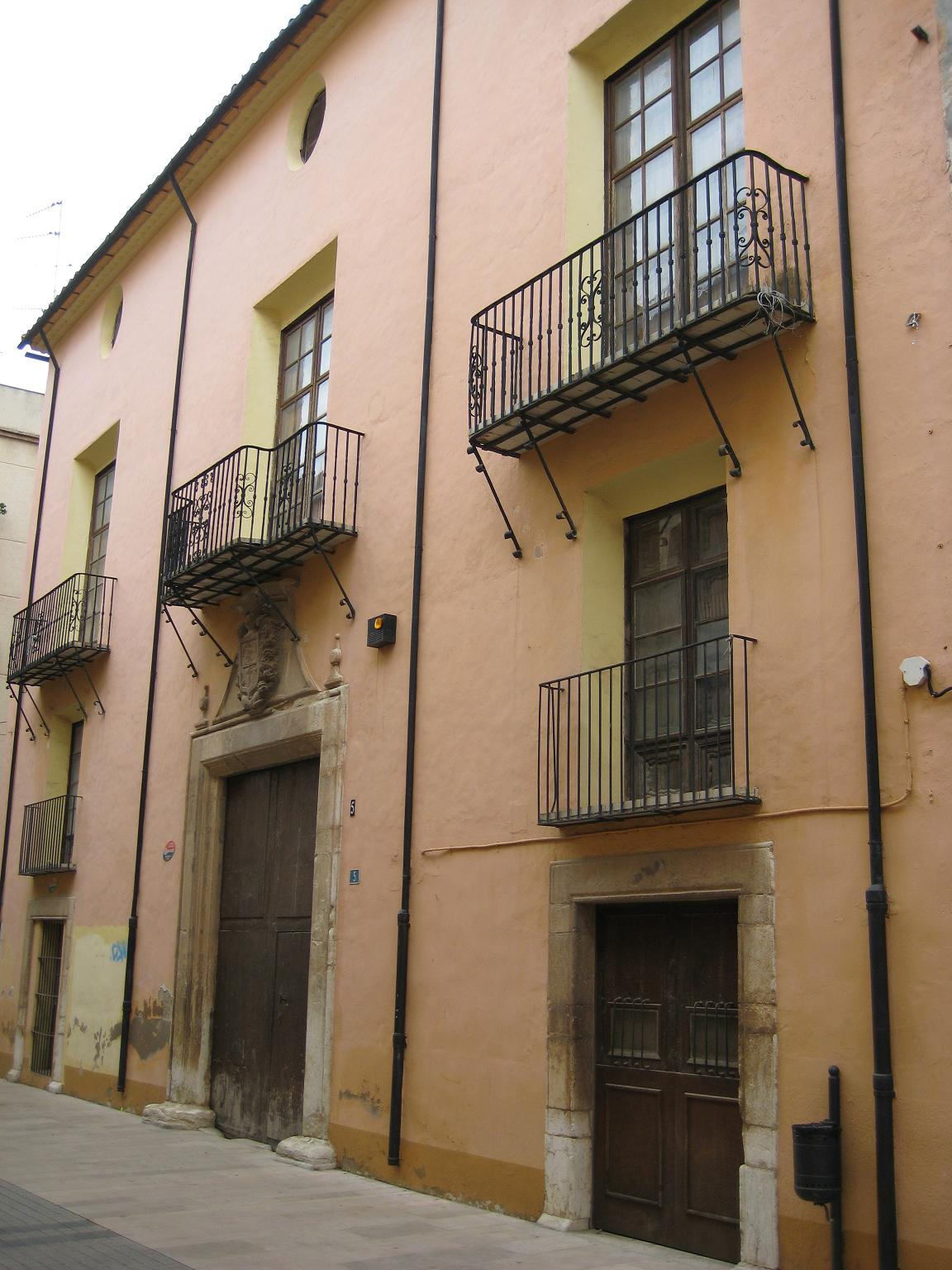
House of the Marquis of Benicarló

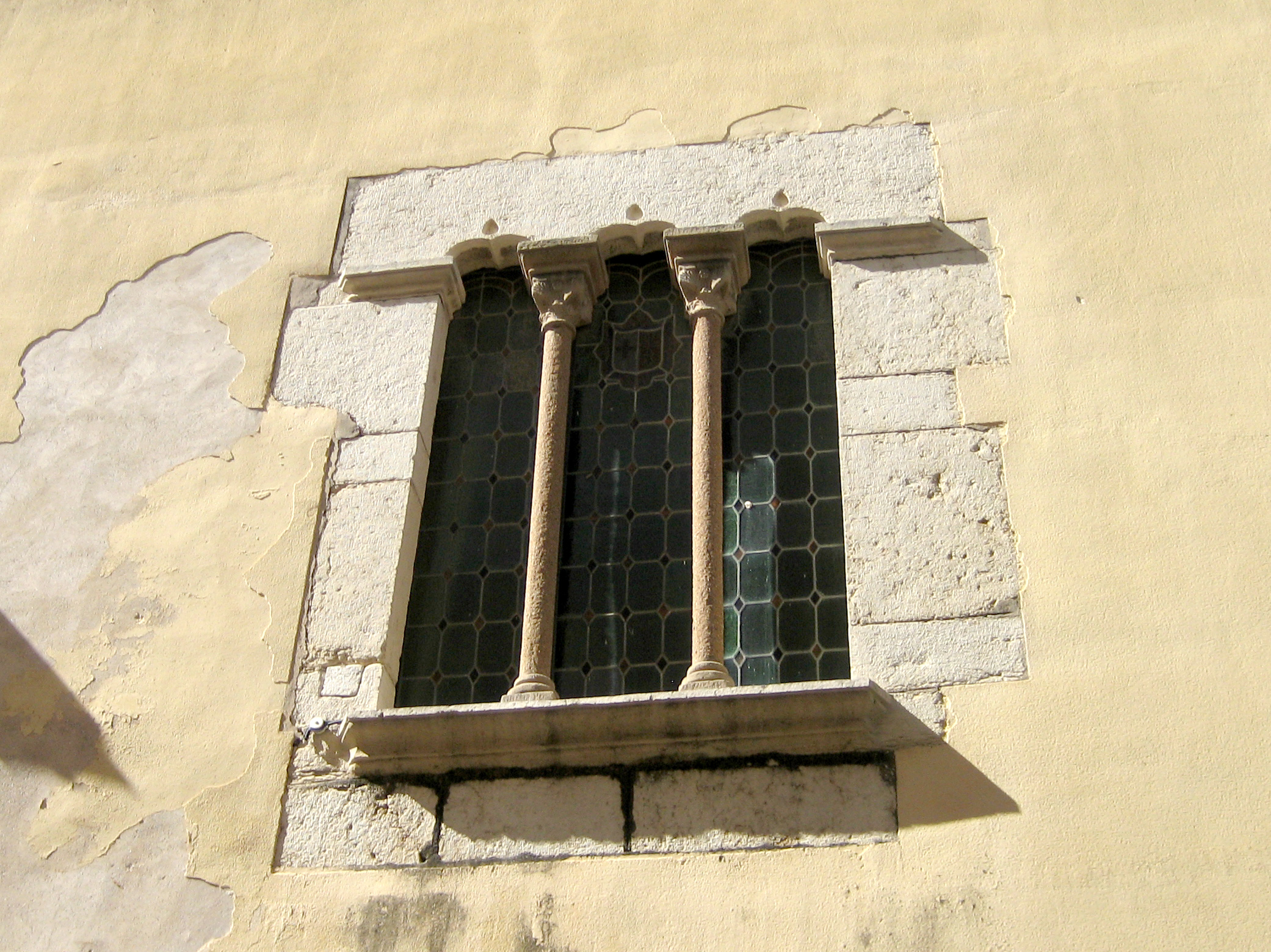
Gothic window of the old Town Hall

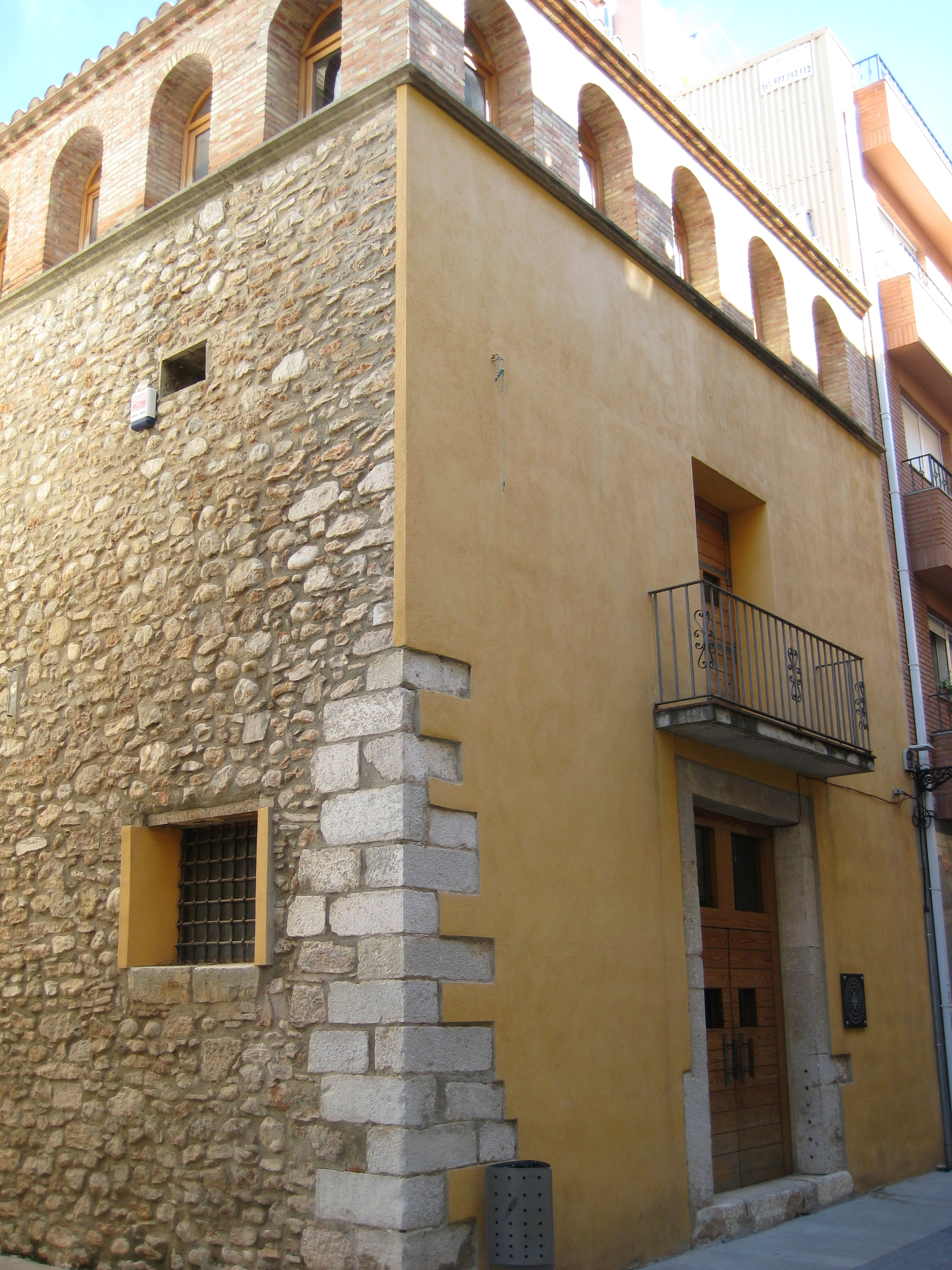
Old prison

- House of the Marquis of Benicarló. House with a voussoir front and heraldic coat of arms, on the main facade, and inside, a large double staircase and magnificent Alcorin counters that decorate the entire kitchen. It is located on Carrer de Sant Joaquim, which was declared an Asset of Cultural Interest in 2007.
- Old Town Hall. The so-called Gothic Hall, with two large windows divided into three parts by two small columns and a narrow arch that supports the first floor, are elements that are still preserved from the old building.
- Casa de la Baronessa, headquarters of the Benicarló Town Hall. Renaissance style.
- Casa Bosch. From the 20th century. On the ground floor there was the entrance hall that led to a leafy rear garden that has now disappeared; as well as the main floor and the original platform. The most outstanding feature of the building is its facade, one of the few modernist examples of the Maestrazgo. It has three floors, each different. The building has great symmetry.
- Iberian village of La Tossa. The materials of this settlement found on the surface of the terraces it occupies are characteristic of sites of this type and chronology (6th-2nd century BC), with Iberian ceramics painted with a linear-geometric theme and a few plant motifs. At the foot of Tossa, near Basseta, the Bovalar Necropolis was found in 1941, whose urns, bronze utensils and trousseau are similar to the materials of the Puig de la Nau necropolis.
- Iberian settlement of Puig de la Nau. One of the most important Iberian sites in the Valencian Community. It reached its peak in the 5th and 4th centuries BC. Interesting Attic ceramics have been discovered, among which the kylyx attributed to the Penthesilea painter (460-450 BC) stands out.
- Old Prison. The building consisted of a ground floor and two floors, the second floor and the ground floor functioned as a prison, since the first floor was the jailer's house. Currently, the first floor houses the headquarters of the Centre d'Estudis del Maestrat. The second floor, above the old provisional prison, houses the headquarters of the association ABRIL (Benicarló Association for the Recovery and Research of Legacy) dedicated to the study and dissemination of local issues. The dungeons from the 14th century stand out.
- Convent of Sant Francesc Cultural Centre (Mucbe). The Convent of Sant Francesc has been restored and houses a cultural centre where conferences, small-scale theatre performances, music concerts in the cloister and temporary exhibitions are held in the various rooms of the complex. Among the permanent exhibitions are "Good land, good harvest" dedicated to the local agricultural world, as well as the exhibition of finds that come basically from the Iberian village of the Puig de la Nau mountain and its necropolis located in its vicinity, although they also contain materials and objects that correspond to other prehistoric sites in the surrounding area, mainly from the Baix Maestrat. Works by artists such as Luis Eduardo Aute and Goya have been exhibited at the Mucbe, Museu Ciutat de Benicarló.

== Twin towns ==
- Ladispoli, Italy

== See also ==
- List of municipalities in Castellón
