= Sant Rafel del Riu =

Sant Rafel del Riu San Rafael del Río
- Municipality and town
- Coat of arms
- Interactive map of Sant Rafel del Riu; San Rafael del Río
- Coordinates: 40°36′20″N 0°20′0″E
- Country: Spain
- Autonomous community: Valencian Community
- Province: Castellón
- Comarca: Baix Maestrat

Area
  - Total: 21.1 km^{2} (8.1 sq mi)
- Elevation: 360 m (1,180 ft)

Population (2025-01-01)
  - Total: 532
  - Density: 25.2/km^{2} (65.3/sq mi)
- Time zone: UTC+1 (CET)
  - Summer (DST): UTC+2 (CEST)
- Postal code: 12510
- Website: https://sanrafaeldelrio.es/ca/

Sant Rafael Del Riu (Valencian) or San Rafael del Río (Spanish) is a municipality in the province of Castellón, Valencian Community, Spain. The town is located near the Sénia River.

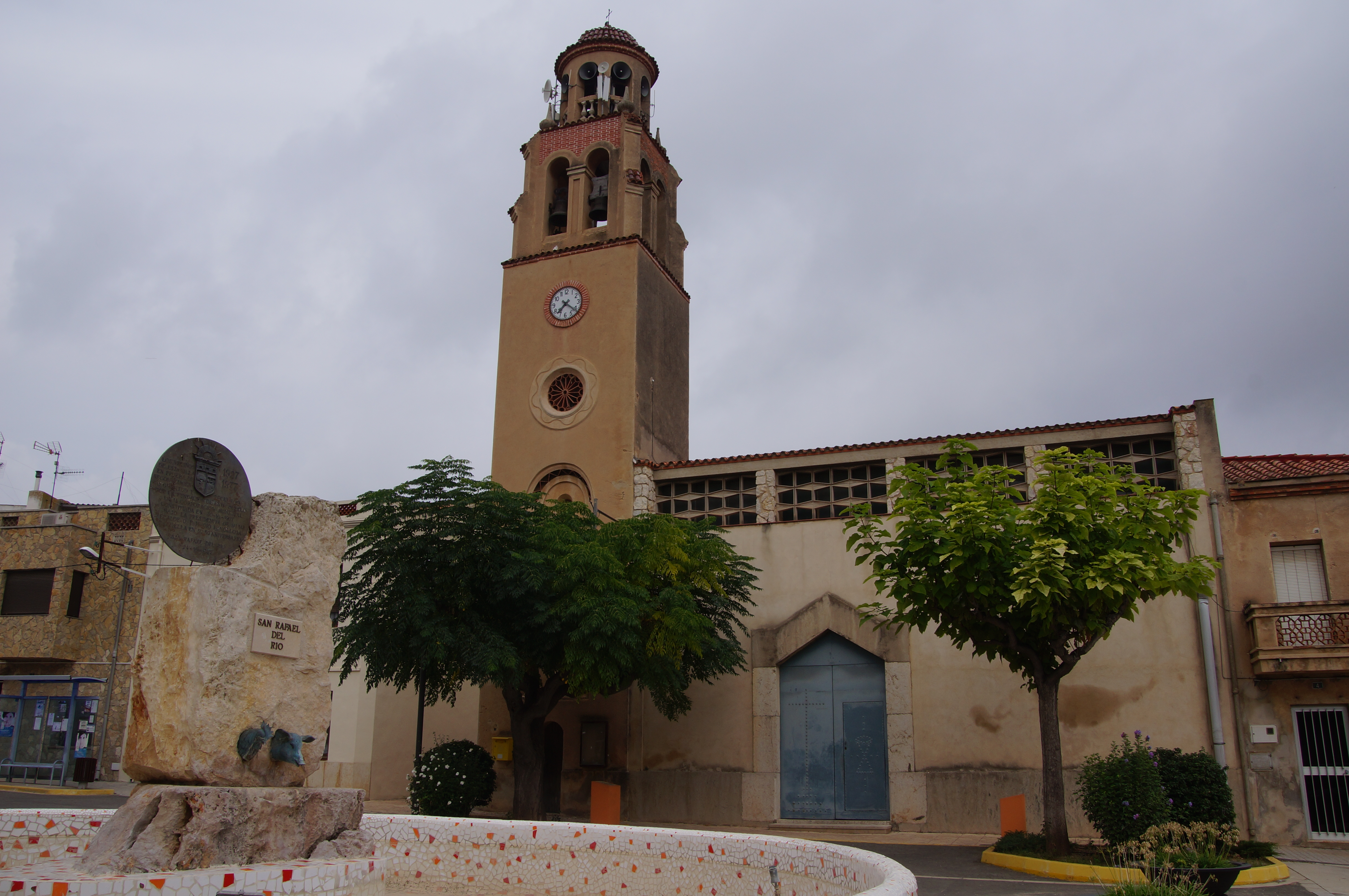
Sant Rafel Parish Church in Sant Rafel Del Riu
