= Sant Jordi / San Jorge =

- Municipality and town
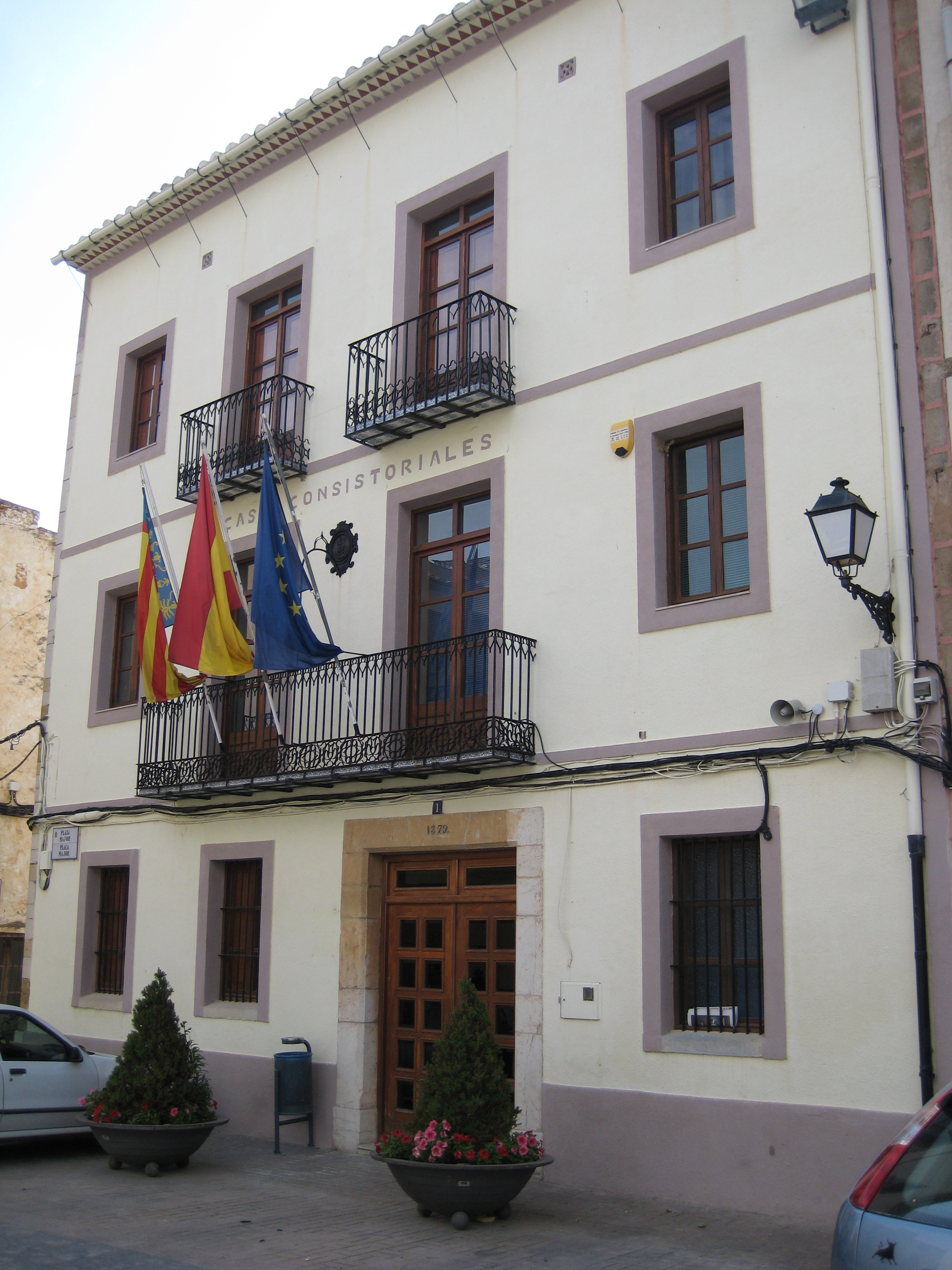

- Coat of arms
- Interactive map of Sant Jordi / San Jorge
- Coordinates: 40°30′34″N 0°19′55″E
- Country: Spain
- Autonomous community: Valencian Community
- Province: Castellón
- Comarca: Baix Maestrat

Area
  - Total: 36.5 km^{2} (14.1 sq mi)
- Elevation: 175 m (574 ft)

Population (2025-01-01)
  - Total: 1,554
  - Density: 42.6/km^{2} (110/sq mi)
- Time zone: UTC+1 (CET)
  - Summer (DST): UTC+2 (CEST)
- Postal code: 12320
- Website: http://www.santjordi.es

Sant Jordi (Valencian: [saɲ ˈdʒɔɾði]) or San Jorge (Spanish: [saŋ ˈxoɾxe]), officially Sant Jordi / San Jorge, is a municipality located in the province of Castellón, Valencian Community, Spain.
