= Traiguera =

- Municipality
- Coat of arms

- Location in Spain
- Coordinates: 40°31′32″N 0°17′26″E
- Country: Spain
- Autonomous community: Valencian Community
- Province: Castelló
- Comarca: Baix Maestrat
- Judicial district: Vinaròs

Area
  - Total: 59.8 km^{2} (23.1 sq mi)
- Elevation: 271 m (889 ft)

Population (2025-01-01)
  - Total: 1,302
  - Density: 21.8/km^{2} (56.4/sq mi)
- Demonym(s): Traiguerí, traiguerina
- Time zone: UTC+1 (CET)
  - Summer (DST): UTC+2 (CEST)
- Postal code: 12330
- Official language(s): Valencian

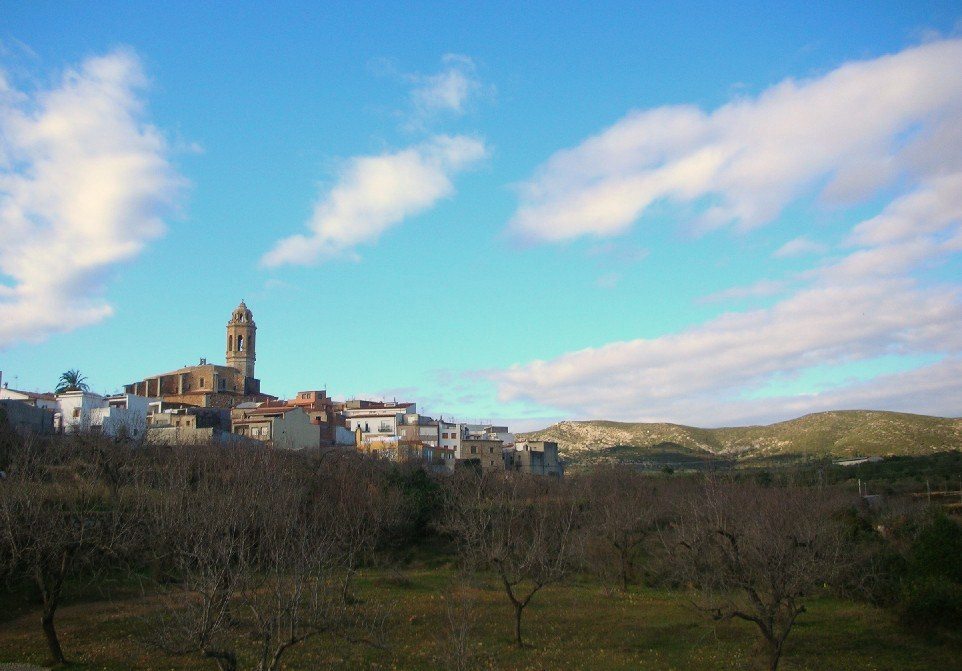
View of Traiguera from the east.

Traiguera is a town and municipality in the Baix Maestrat comarca, province of Castelló, Valencian Community, Spain. It is part of the Taula del Sénia free association of municipalities.

The town is located in a central position in the comarca, north of the Muntanyes de Cervera. The Serra de Sant Pere mountain range rises on the western side of Traiguera. This town was mentioned as part of Ilercavonia by Ptolemy.

Besides Mediterranean agriculture, mainly almonds, olives and oranges, the town has a traditional ceramic industry, much affected now by the current crisis. The name of the place 'Traiguera' comes from Aegilops geniculata, a coarse cereal that was cultivated until the Middle Ages.

One of the main tourist attractions is the Santuari de la Font de la Salut, located among mountains 2 km south of the town.

== Villages ==
- Traiguera
- Font de la Salut
- Masia Avenc
