= Cervera del Maestre =

Cervera del Maestre Cervera del Maestrat
- Municipality
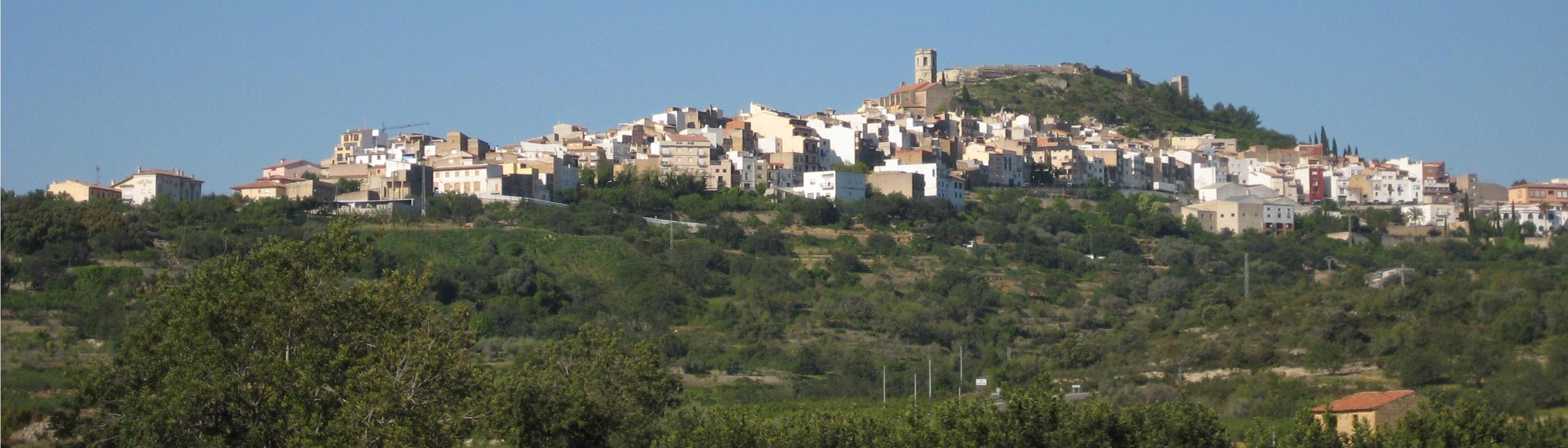

- Coat of arms

- Location in Spain
- Coordinates: 40°27′14″N 0°16′31″E
- Country: Spain
- Autonomous community: Valencian Community
- Province: Castelló
- Comarca: Baix Maestrat
- Judicial district: Vinaròs
- Established: 331 BC

Area
  - Total: 93.2 km^{2} (36.0 sq mi)
- Elevation: 313 m (1,027 ft)

Population (2025-01-01)
  - Total: 617
  - Density: 6.62/km^{2} (17.1/sq mi)
- Demonym(s): Cerverí, cerverina
- Time zone: UTC+1 (CET)
  - Summer (DST): UTC+2 (CEST)
- Postal code: 12578
- Official language(s): Valencian

Cervera del Maestre (Valencian: Cervera del Maestrat) is a municipality in the comarca of Baix Maestrat in the Valencian Community, Spain. It is located at the southern end of the Cervera Mountains, above the Rambla de Cervera seasonal river.

Cervera is located on a hill with a ruined Moorish castle top of it. It lies in an area of maquis shrub and cultivated plots, mainly almond, carob and olive trees. There is a ruined ermita south of the town.

Cervera del Maestre is part of the Taula del Sénia free association of municipalities.

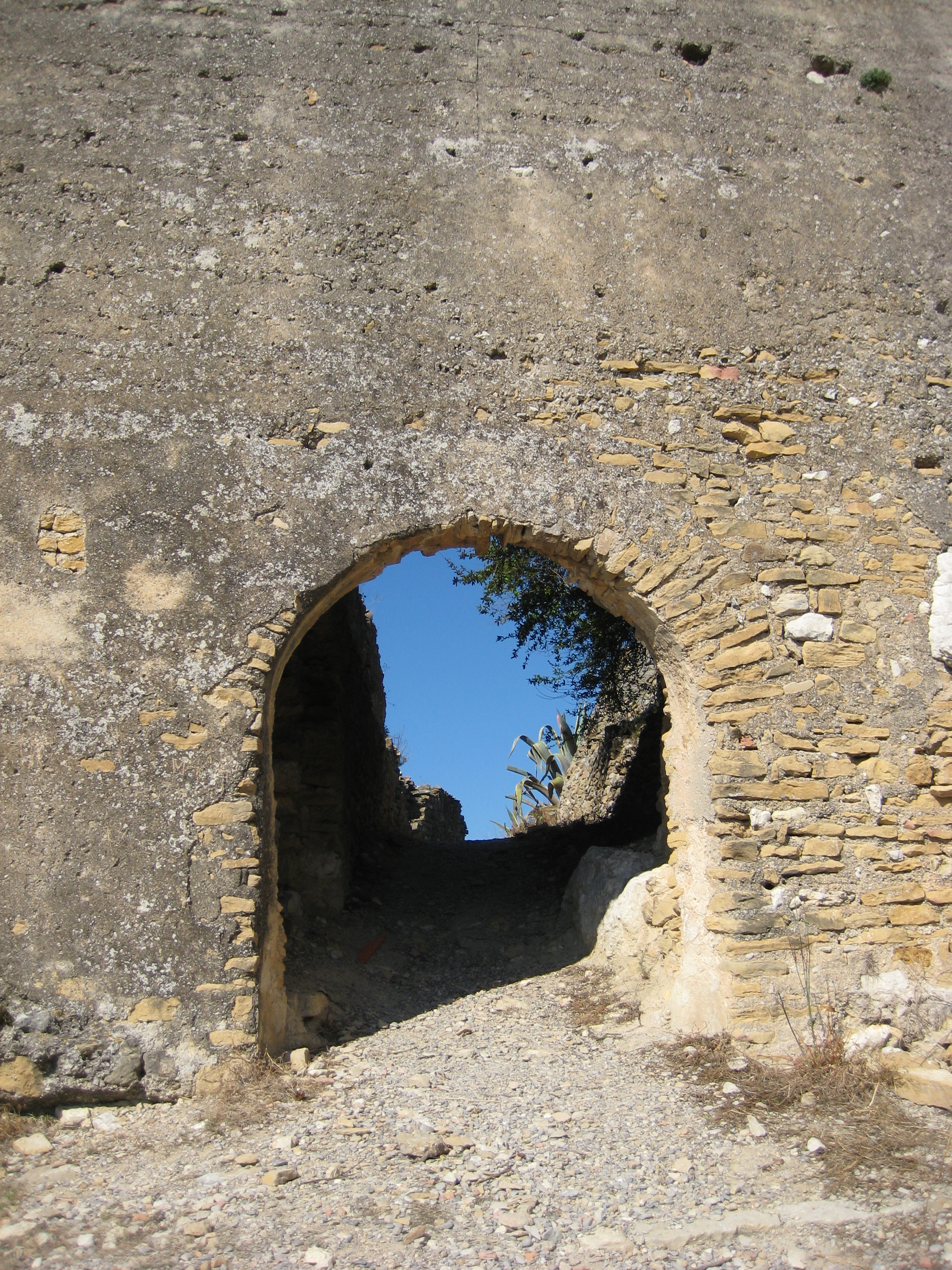
Entrance to the castle on top of the hill

== See also ==
- List of municipalities in Castellón
