= Sénia (river) =

River in Catalonia and Valencia, Spain

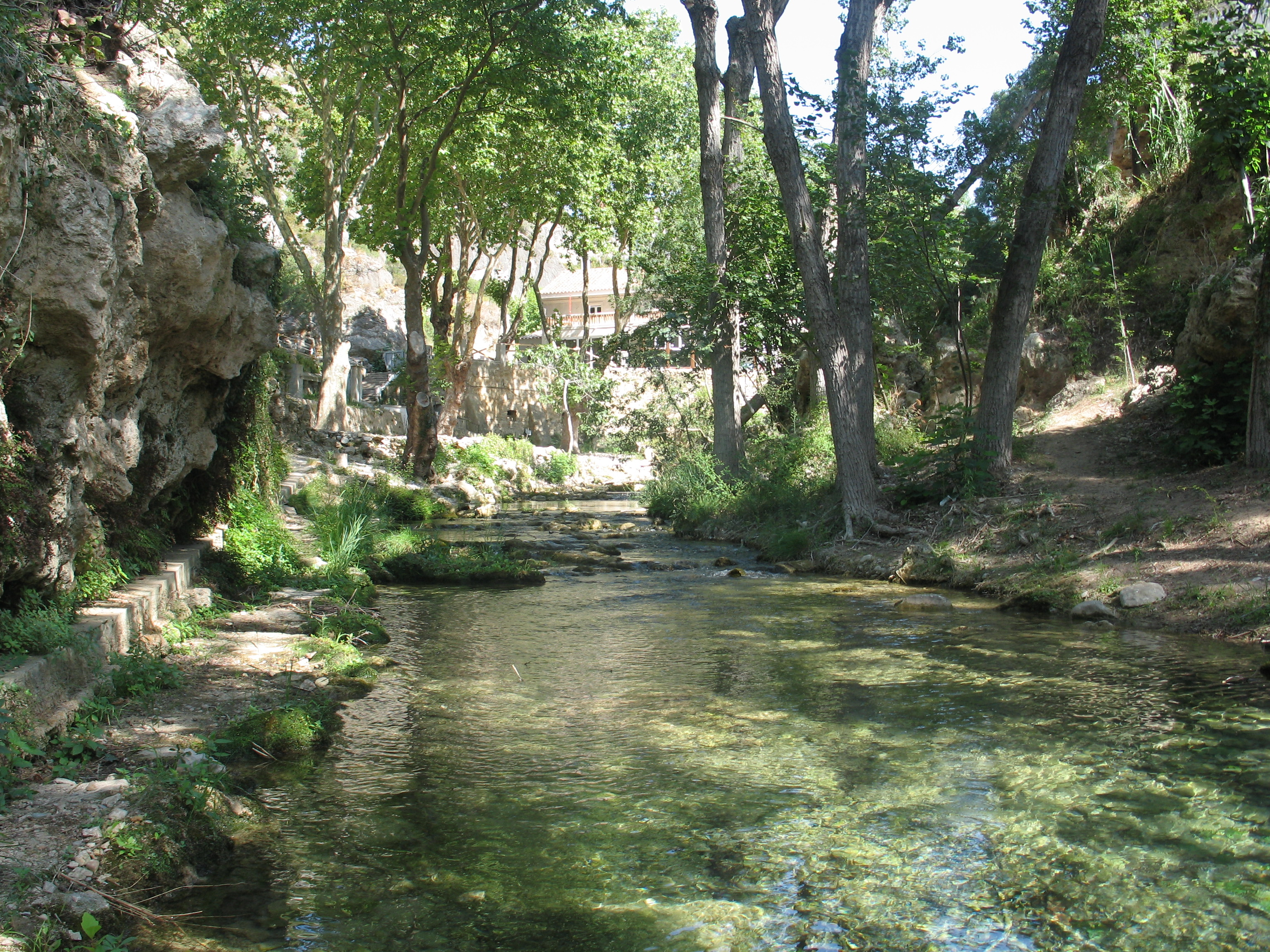
- Upper course of the Sénia river in the Ports de Tortosa-Beseit

Location
- Country: Spain
- Autonomous communities: Catalonia, Valencian Community

Physical characteristics
- Source
  - location: Barranc del Salt, Ports de Tortosa-Beseit
  - elevation: 1,358 m (4,455 ft)
- Mouth
  - location: Sol de Riu, Mediterranean Sea
  - coordinates: 40°31′23″N 0°30′53″E
  - elevation: 0 m (0 ft)
- Length: 50 km (31 mi)
- Basin size: 197 km^{2} (76 sq mi)

The Sénia is a coastal river in Spain that flows through the eastern part of the Iberian Peninsula. Along a significant portion of its course, it acts as a border between the autonomous communities of Catalonia and Valencia, and respectively their provinces of Tarragona and Castelló. It has a length of 50 km and it flows into the Mediterranean Sea.

== Route ==
The river originates in the Ports de Tortosa-Beseit, within the municipality of La Pobla de Benifassà. The river's waters are accumulated in the Ulldecona dam, also located in the same municipality at an elevation of 477 meters above sea level. This reservoir, with a surface area of 116 hectares and a capacity of 11 hm³, is the only infrastructure regulating the river and is used for irrigation.

From the reservoir, the river passes through areas with steep slopes, which provide it with high oxygenation. Vegetation is abundant in this area, contributing to maintaining the habitat for aquatic life. Further downstream, before reaching the homonymous municipality, water diversions are made to supply irrigation for an area of approximately 2,360 hectares.

Just before the town of La Sénia, the river marks the border between Catalonia and the Valencian Community. From this point until its mouth, the Sénia serves as a border between these two autonomous communities.

As it moves away from this point, the river practically receives no natural contributions, and the water quality deteriorates significantly. Near the town of Alcanar, the river enters the Plana de Vinaròs and crosses this area until it flows into the Mediterranean Sea at Sol de Riu.

This river is described in the sixth volume of the Diccionario geográfico-estadístico-histórico de España y sus posesiones de Ultramar by Pascual Madoz with the following words:

CENIA: r. de la prov. de Castellon de la Plana, part. jud. de Morella. Tiene su origen en la auto. tenencia de Benifasá, 3/4 de hora al N. de Fredes, donde brota la fuente principal. Conocido entonces con el nombre de este pueblo, lleva su curso hácia el S. hasta que tuerce al E. precipitándose de una altura considerable llamada Salto de Fredes, y va serpenteando hasta llegar al sitio denominado Tollet den nou, en cuyo punto revolviendo al S., toma el nombre de r. Mangraner. Da impulso á un molino harinero, despues de recibir el barranco de la Fon, que desde el puerto de Tortosa se desliza por debajo de un puente medio derruido, engrosándose con las aguas de la rambla de la Puebla. (V.) que baja de O. á E. por el S. de Bellestar y el monast., desde cuya confluencia vuelve á torcer hácia el E. con la denominacion de r. de Benifasá. Mueve entonces otro harinero que tiene á su izq. llamado del Abad, en donde hay un puente de madera; 1/2 hora mas abajo á la der. una fáb. de hierro, y luego un martinete y se introduce en el térm. de la Cenia (prov. de Tarragona, part. jud. de Tortosa), desde cuyo momento toma este nombre que conserva hasta su desagüe. Sigue su curso sirviendo de límites los ant. reinos de Valencia y principado de Cataluña, y hoy dia a las prov. de Castellon de la Plana y Tarragona; toca los térm. de Rosell, Ulldecona y Trahiguera, y por entre Vinaroz y Alcanar desemboca en el mediterráneo en la Torre del Sol del Riu. Su curso será aproximadamente de unas 12 horas, es perenne aunque de poco caudal, y despues de fertilizar algunas huertas, mueve unos 25 molinos harineros, 4 de papel blanco, id. de estraza, 4 batanes y 2 martinetes: cerca de su desagüe se ve un sólido puente de mamposteria que da paso á la carretera de Cataluña, y antes se ven otros de la misma clase y algunos provisionales de madera, para la comunicacion de unos pueblos con otros.

— (Madoz 1847, p. 309)

== Tributaries ==
- From the left:
  - Barranc dels Terrers: 40°35′54.06″N 0°26′24.75″E

== See also ==
- La Sénia
- List of rivers of Spain
- Taula del Sénia
- Tinença de Benifassà

== Sources ==
- Madoz, Pascual (1847). "Cenia". Diccionario geográfico-estadístico-histórico de España y sus posesiones de Ultramar. Vol. VI. Madrid. p. 309.
