= Canet lo Roig =

- Municipality
- Coat of arms

- Location in Spain
- Coordinates: 40°33′03″N 0°14′33″E
- Country: Spain
- Autonomous community: Valencian Community
- Province: Castelló
- Comarca: Baix Maestrat
- Judicial district: Vinaròs

Area
  - Total: 68.7 km^{2} (26.5 sq mi)
- Elevation: 329 m (1,079 ft)

Population (2025-01-01)
  - Total: 715
  - Density: 10.4/km^{2} (27.0/sq mi)
- Demonym(s): Canetà, canetana
- Time zone: UTC+1 (CET)
  - Summer (DST): UTC+2 (CEST)
- Postal code: 12350
- Official language(s): Valencian

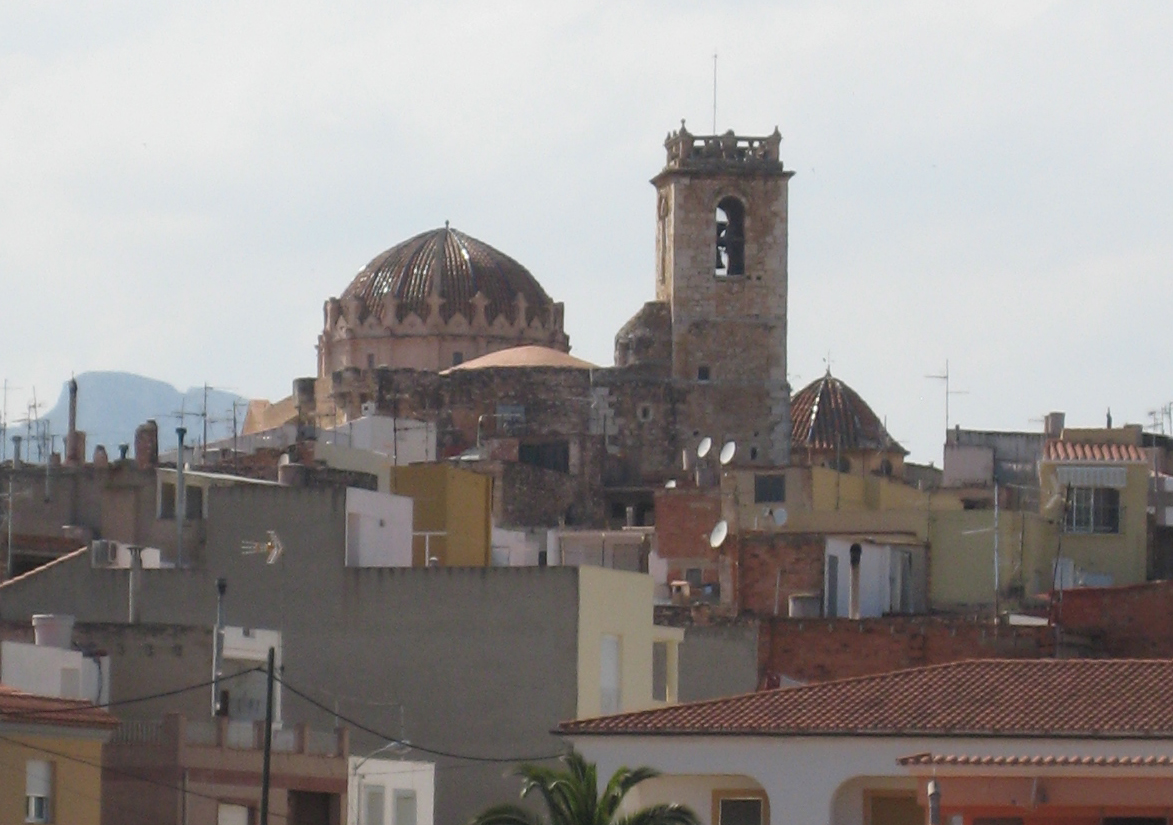
Church of Sant Michael; Canet lo Roig

Canet lo Roig (Valencian pronunciation: [kaˈned lo ˈrɔtʃ]) is a municipality in the comarca of Baix Maestrat in the Valencian Community, Spain.

The Serra de Sant Pere rises southeast of the town and the Cérvol River flows north of it. The Moles de Xert rise west of Canet, on the right side of the road between this town and Xert.

It is an agricultural town surrounded by cultivated plots, mainly almond, carob and olive trees, as well as some cereal fields. The population of the town is under 900. Canet lo Roig is part of the Taula del Sénia free association of municipalities. Canet lo Roig has its own "village language", like most rural villages, but inhabitants speak Valencian and Spanish.

== See also ==
- List of municipalities in Castellón
