= Ulldecona Dam =

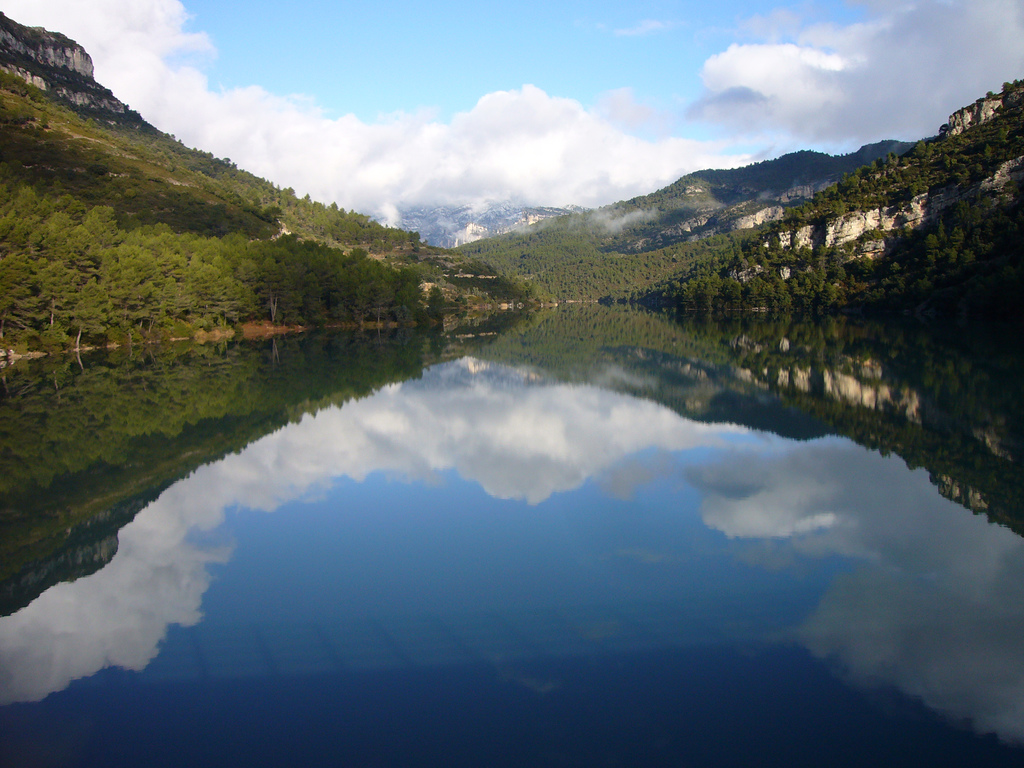
- View of the reservoir

- Location within Spain
- Official name: Embassament d'Ulldecona
- Country: Spain
- Location: Pobla de Benifassà, Valencian Community, Spain
- Coordinates: 40°40′15″N 0°13′52″E
- Status: Operational
- Opening date: 1967

Dam and spillways
- Type of dam: Gravity dam
- Impounds: Barranc de la Fou, Barranc de Teulatí and Barranc de la Pobla
- Height: 54 m (177 ft)
- Length: 180 m (590 ft)

Reservoir
- Total capacity: 11 hm³
- Surface area: 817 ha

The Ulldecona Dam (Catalan: Embassament d'Ulldecona) (Spanish: Embalse de Ulldecona) is a gravity dam located in the Tinença de Benifassà and the Ports de Tortosa-Beseit mountains, within the La Pobla de Benifassà municipal limits, Valencian Community, Spain.

The dam was built in 1967 and was financed by farmers from the town of Ulldecona, hence its name.

== Description ==
The reservoir is at the confluence of three seasonal rivers, the Barranc de la Fou, Barranc de Teulatí, also known as Barranc de la Tenalla, and the Barranc de la Pobla, all part of the Cenia river basin.

Its reservoir reaches a surface of 817 ha with a capacity of 11 hm³. This dam belongs to the Hydrographic Confederation of the Júcar. The abandoned village of Mangraner is located at the northwestern end of the reservoir not far from the shore.

== Tourism ==
The dam attracts tourists, especially in the summer. Right by the reservoir there is a restaurant, accommodation, pedalos and information about hiking routes in the neighboring karstic mountainous area. The easiest way to reach the Ulldecona Dam is from Cenia located close by.

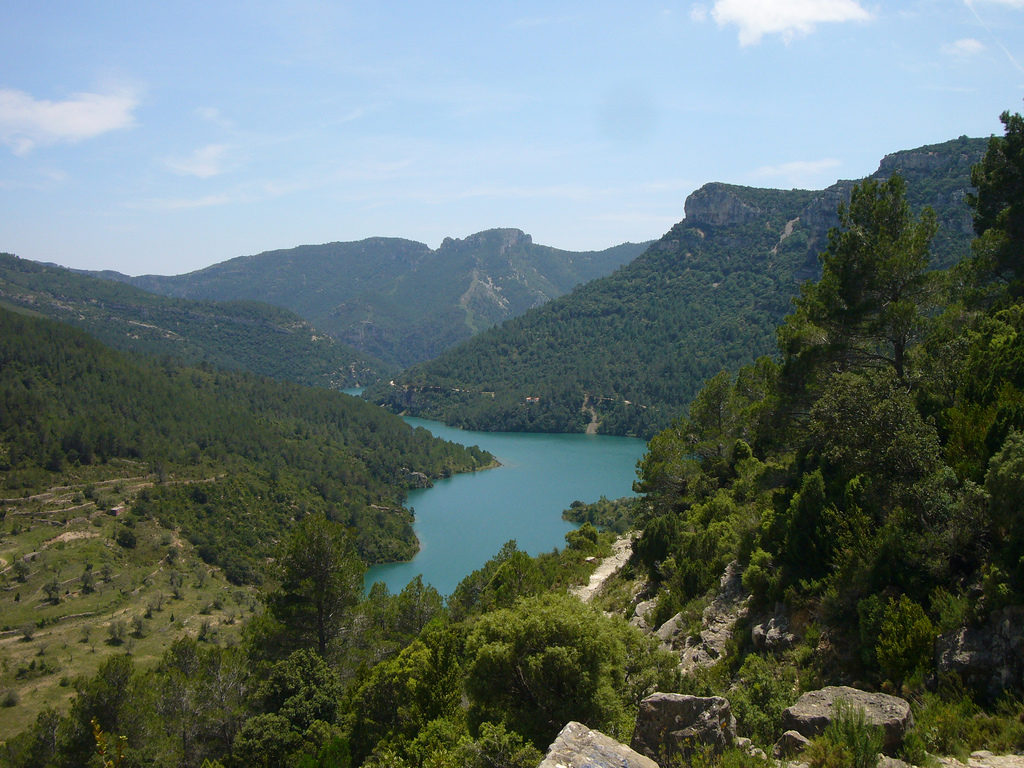
View of the Ulldecona reservoir in the summer .

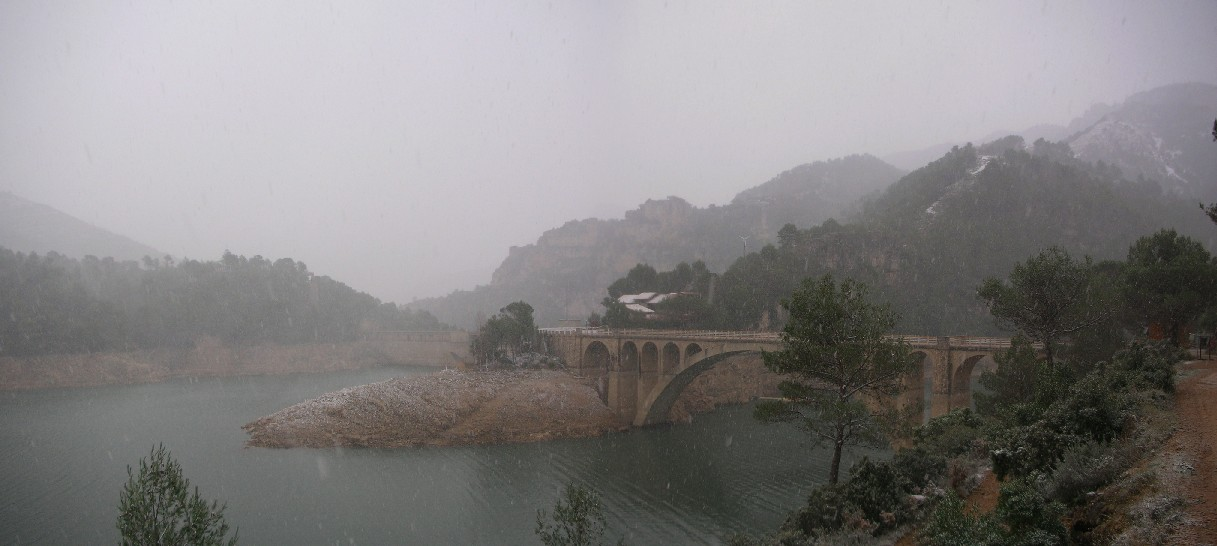
A winter snowstorm over the Ulldecona Dam.
