= Tinença de Benifassà =

Coordinates: 40°39′24″N 0°09′20″E

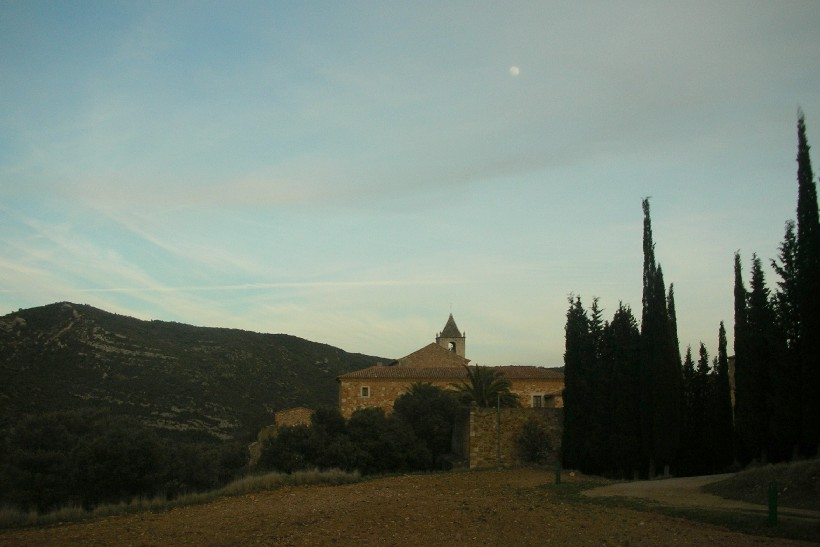
Santa Maria de Benifassà monastery in the heart of the Tinença de Benifassà

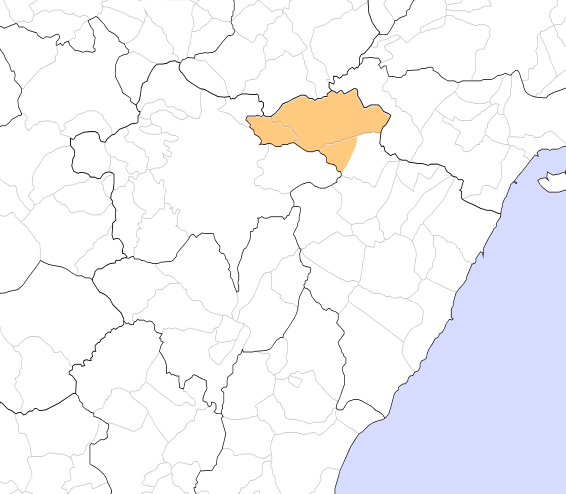
Map of the Tinença de Benifassà

Tinença de Benifassà (Valencian: [tiˈnɛnsa ðe benifaˈsa]) is a historical comarca of the Valencian Community, Spain. It is nowadays part of the Baix Maestrat, one of the present-day Comarques of the Valencian Community, even though commercial and human relationships have been stronger with Els Ports in the west, the Terres de l'Ebre in the northeast and the Matarranya in the northwest in historical times.

== Geography ==
The Tinença de Benifassà is situated within a mountainous area known as Muntanyes de Benifassà located in the southern region of the Ports de Tortosa-Beseit. The main villages are Castell de Cabres, la Pobla de Benifassà, el Bellestar, el Boixar, Coratxà, Fredes and Bel.

The Ulldecona Dam, a scenic reservoir supplied by three tributaries of the Sénia river, is located within the La Pobla de Benifassà municipal limits. With a surface of 116 hectares (290 acres) and a capacity of 11 cubic hectometres (8,900 acre-feet), the reservoir plays a very important role in the irrigation of agricultural crops in the surrounding region.

One of the main products of the area is good-quality honey, commercialised as Mel de la Tinença de Benifassà.

The ranges of this sparsely populated mountain area have the most important forested zone of the region. Thus the area of the Tinença de Benifassà together with the neighboring Serra del Turmell and Serra de Vallivana mountain chains was declared a Site of Community Importance by the European Union under the name Tinença de Benifassà, Turmell i Vallivana.

== History ==
The area was conquered by the saracens in 1230 and was administered by the Principality of Catalonia between 1260 and 1262 along with Vallibona and Rossell.

La Tinença de Benifassà was documented as a comarca in the map Comarques naturals del Regne de València made by Emili Beüt in 1934. Most of the villages in the historical comarca have become very depopulated in recent decades owing to the abandonment of traditional agricultural practices by the local youth and the lifestyle changes that swept over rural Spain during the second half of the 20th century.

The Generalitat Valenciana administration declared the whole area of the historical comarca a Natural Park under the name Parc Natural de la Tinença de Benifassà in May 2006.

== See also ==
- Santa Maria de Benifassà
- Ports de Tortosa-Beseit
- El Bobalar de Sant Jordi
- Ulldecona Reservoir
