= Càlig =

Càlig Cálig
- Municipality
- Coat of arms

- Location in Spain
- Coordinates: 40°27′42″N 0°21′13″E
- Country: Spain
- Autonomous community: Valencian Community
- Province: Castellón
- Comarca: Baix Maestrat
- Judicial district: Vinaròs

Area
  - Total: 27.5 km^{2} (10.6 sq mi)
- Elevation: 122 m (400 ft)

Population (2025-01-01)
  - Total: 2,042
  - Density: 74.3/km^{2} (192/sq mi)
- Demonym(s): Calijó, calijona
- Time zone: UTC+1 (CET)
  - Summer (DST): UTC+2 (CEST)
- Postal code: 12589
- Official language(s): Valencian

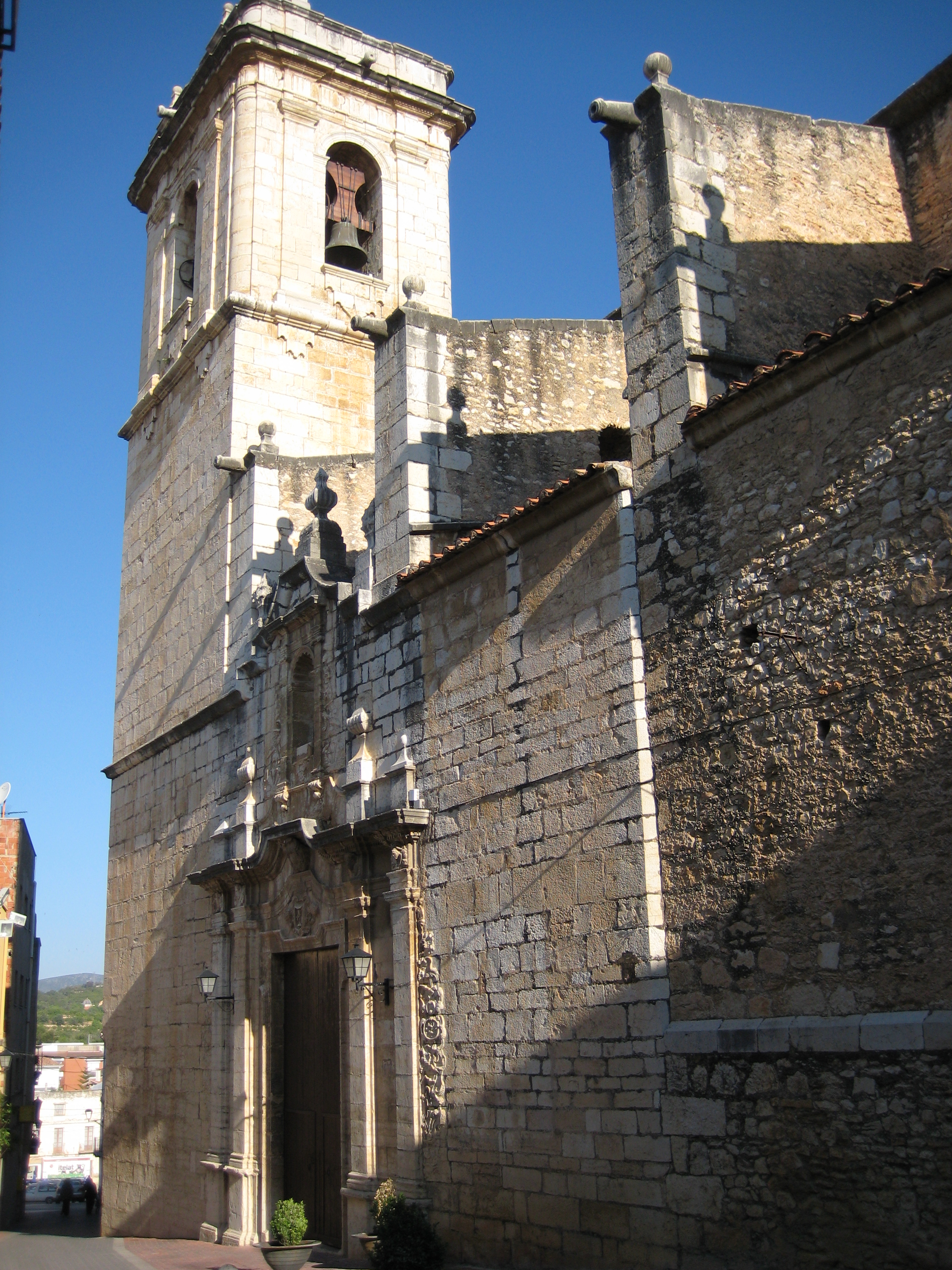
Sant Llorenç de Càlig church

Càlig (Valencian: [ˈkalitʃ]; Spanish: Cálig [ˈkaliɣ], also [ˈkalitʃ]) is a municipality in the comarca of Baix Maestrat in the Valencian Community, Spain.

The town is located at the centre of the comarca. It is an agricultural town surrounded by cultivated plots, as well as almond tree and olive tree fields. There are not so many fruit and orange trees in its term. Càlig is part of the Taula del Sénia free association of municipalities.

== Events ==
In August, there is Fiesta Patronales. At this event, there is a bullfight, at which the bull will not be killed and an open-air disco party lasting the whole night.

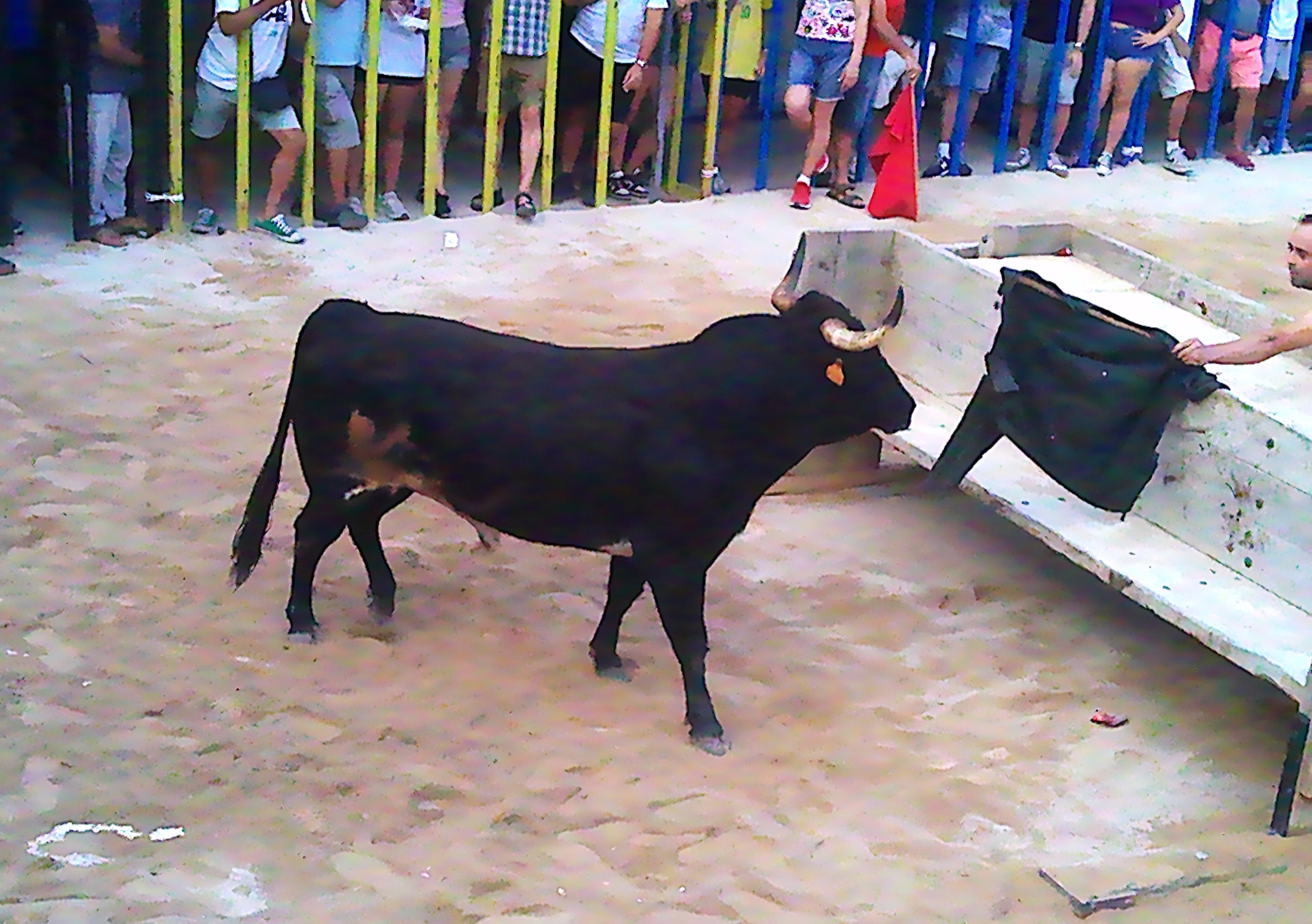
Bullfight at Fiesta Patronales

== See also ==
- List of municipalities in Castellón
