= La Pobla de Benifassà =

- Municipality
- Coat of arms

- Location in Spain
- Coordinates: 40°39′24″N 0°09′20″E
- Country: Spain
- Autonomous community: Valencian Community
- Province: Castellón
- Comarca: Baix Maestrat
- Judicial district: Vinaròs

Government
  - Alcalde: Victor Gargallo Bel (PSD)

Area
  - Total: 136 km^{2} (53 sq mi)
- Elevation: 705 m (2,313 ft)

Population (2025-01-01)
  - Total: 229
  - Density: 1.68/km^{2} (4.36/sq mi)
- Demonym(s): Poblatà, poblatana
- Time zone: UTC+1 (CET)
  - Summer (DST): UTC+2 (CEST)
- Postal code: 12599
- Official language(s): Valencian
- Website: Official website

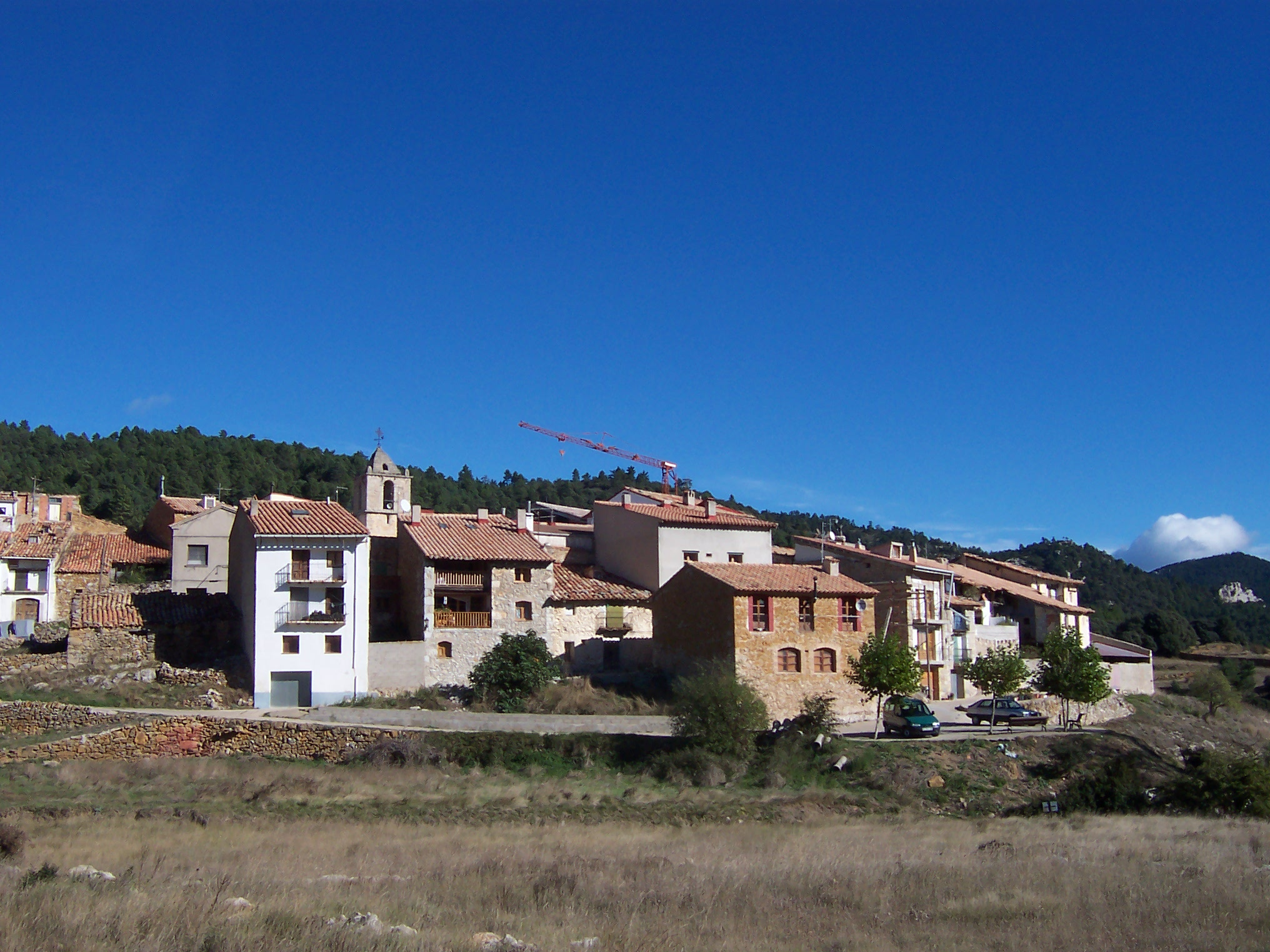
View of Fredes.

La Pobla de Benifassà (Valencian pronunciation: [la ˈpɔbla ðe benifaˈsa]) is a municipality in the comarca of Baix Maestrat in the Valencian Community, Spain.

It is located in the historical comarca of Tinença de Benifassà. Most villages in the area have only residual population owing to massive emigration in the late 20th century.

The Ulldecona Dam is located within the La Pobla de Benifassà municipal limits.

== Villages ==
- El Ballestar
- El Boixar
- Santa Maria de Benifassà monastery
- Coratxà
- Fredes
- Mangraner
- Mas del Molí de l'Abat
- La Pobla de Benifassà
- Sant Pere

== See also ==
- Ports de Tortosa-Beseit
