= La Salzadella =

- Municipality
- Flag Coat of arms
- Interactive map of La Salzadella
- Country: Spain

Population (2025-01-01)
  - Total: 671

La Salzadella is a municipality located in Spain.

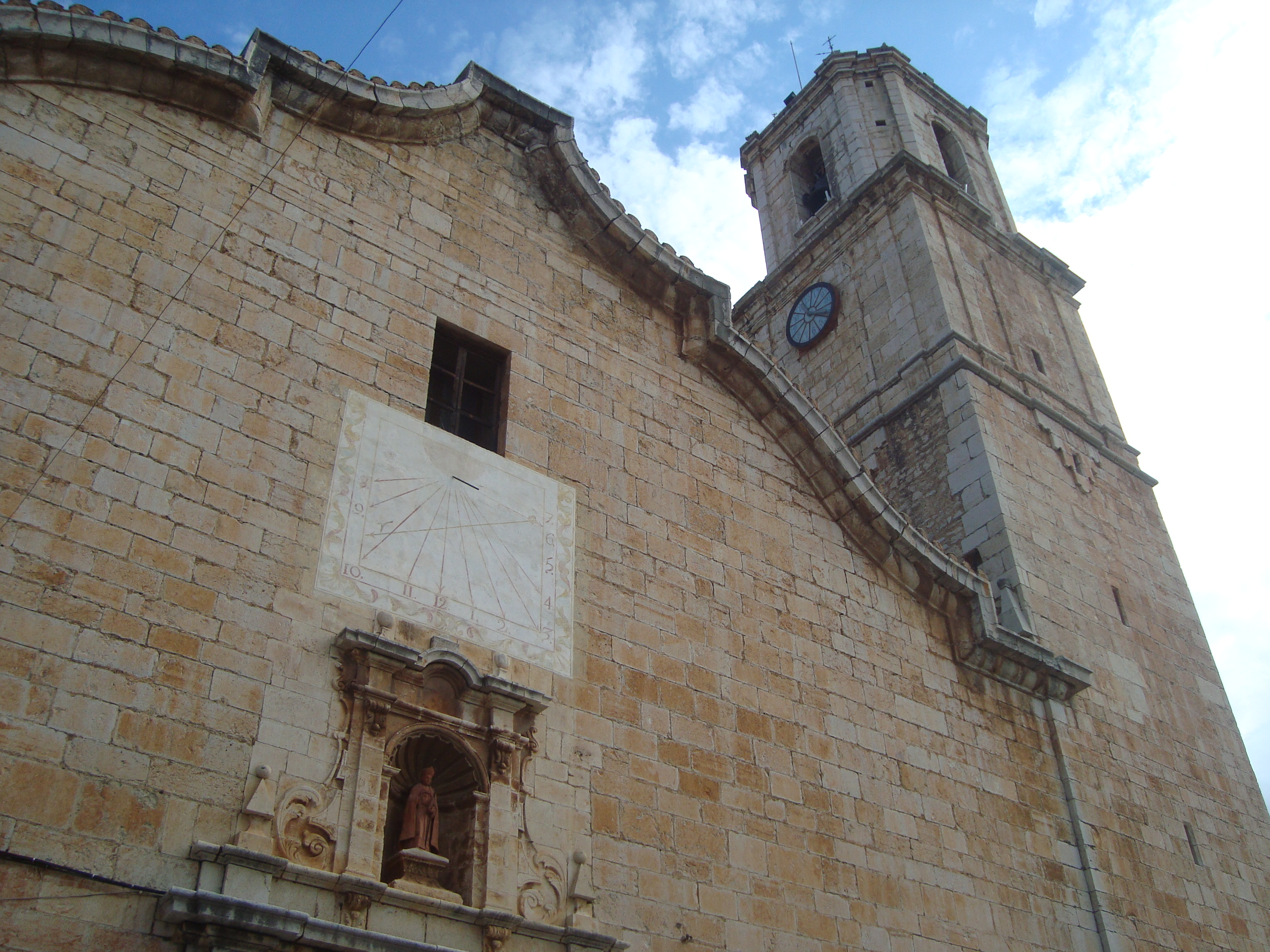
Parish Church of the Assumption of the Salzadella

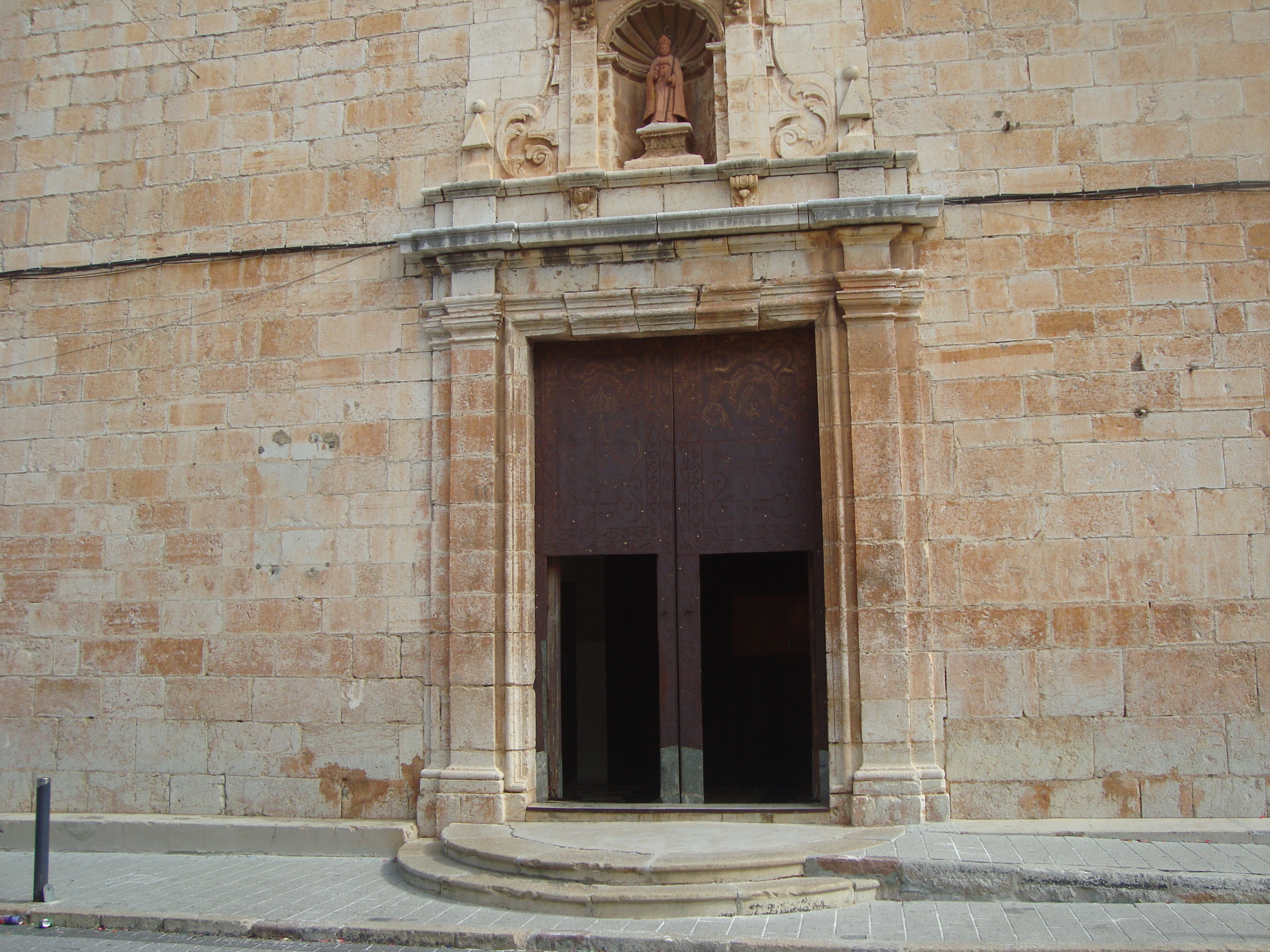
Parish Church of Our Lady of the Assumption of Salzadella
