= Baix Maestrat =

Coordinates: 40°28′15″N 0°28′29″E

Baix Maestrat Bajo Maestrazgo
- Comarca
- Country: Spain
- Autonomous community: Valencian Community
- Province: Castelló / Castellón
- Capital and largest city: Vinaròs
- Municipalities: 18 municipalities: Alcalà de Xivert, Benicarló, Càlig, Canet lo Roig, Castell de Cabres, Cervera del Maestre, La Jana, Peñíscola, La Pobla de Benifassà, Rossell, La Salzadella, San Rafael del Río, Sant Jordi / San Jorge, Sant Mateu, Santa Magdalena de Pulpis, Traiguera, Vinaròs, Xert

Area
  - Total: 1,221.32 km^{2} (471.55 sq mi)

Population (2019)
  - Total: 81,871
  - Density: 67.035/km^{2} (173.62/sq mi)
- Time zone: UTC+1 (CET)
  - Summer (DST): UTC+2 (CEST)
- Largest municipalities: Vinaròs, Benicarló

Baix Maestrat (Valencian: [ˈbajʒ maesˈtɾat]; Spanish: Bajo Maestrazgo [ˈbaxo maesˈtɾaθɣo]) is a coastal comarca located in the north of the province of Castellón, Valencian Community, Spain. The capital of the comarca is Vinaròs.

== Municipalities ==
The comarca is composed of 18 municipalities, listed below with their surface areas, their populations at the 2011 Census, and (according to the latest official estimates as of 1 January 2019), their population density in 2019:

Municipality	Surface area in km^{2}	Population (2011)	Population (2019)	Density per km^{2} (2019)
Vinaròs	95.46	28,267	28,682	300.46
Benicarló	47.86	26,355	26,912	562.31
Peniscola	78.97	7,822	7,612	96.39
Alcalà de Xivert	167.56	7,826	6,680	39.87
Sant Mateu	64.62	2,062	1,963	30.38
Càlig	27.47	2,178	1,950	70.99
Traiguera	59.76	1,586	1,378	23.06
Sant Jordi / San Jorge	36.49	1,007	972	26.64
Rossell	74.93	1,133	937	12.51
Santa Magdalena de Polpís	66.49	844	768	11.55
La Salzadella	49.92	846	704	14.10
Xert	82.51	846	701	8.50
La Jana	19.50	766	675	34.56
Canet lo Roig	68.67	828	674	9.82
Cervera del Maestrat	93.24	686	575	6.17
San Rafael del Río	21.15	526	469	22.17
La Pobla de Benifassà	136.00	288	202	1.49
Castell de Cabres	30.72	20	17	0.55

Data from National Institute of Statistics 2019

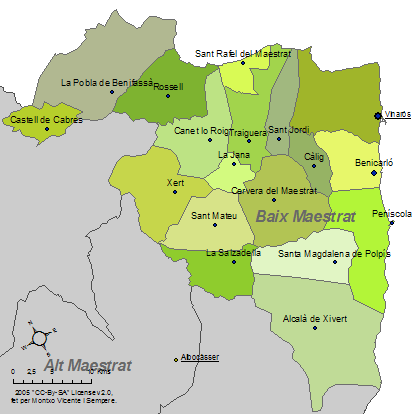
Municipalities of Baix Maestrat

== Geography ==
The comarca borders to the north-west with the province of Teruel (Aragon), to the north-east with the province of Tarragona (Catalonia), to the east with the Mediterranean Sea, to the south with the comarca of Plana Alta (Castellón, Valencia) and to the west with the comarcas of Alt Maestrat (Castellón, Valencia) and Els Ports (Castellón, Valencia).

Within the comarca lies Serra d'Irta, an 18.8 km long mountain range and the largest undeveloped coastal area within the Valencian Community. The range includes the Natural Park of Serra d'Irta, which was declared a protected area by the Valencian Regional Government on July 16, 2002.

== Economic activities ==
The area's traditional economic activities include agriculture (citrus fruits, olive trees, artichokes) and fishing. Artichokes from Benicarló are covered by a geographic designation of origin.

== Historical delimitations ==
The current comarca of Baix Maestrat also includes the historical subcomarcas of Tinença de Benifassà and Plana de Vinaròs. The localities of Albocàsser and Tírig (today located in Alt Maestrat), and Les Coves de Vinromà, Sarratella, La Torre d'en Doménec, and Vilanova d'Alcolea (in Plana Alta), were also formerly part of the historic comarca.

== See also ==
- Tinença de Benifassà
