= La Sénia =

Town and municipality in Catalonia, Spain

- Municipality of Spain
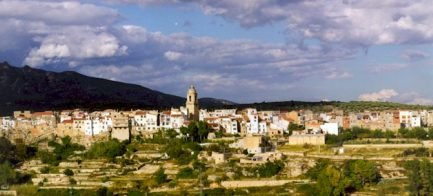

- Coat of arms

- Location in Spain
- Coordinates: 40°38′1″N 0°17′7″E
- Country: Spain
- Autonomous Community: Catalonia
- Province: Tarragona
- Comarca: Montsià

Government
  - Mayor: Maria Victoria Almuni Balada

Area
  - Total: 108.41 km^{2} (41.86 sq mi)
- Elevation: 369 m (1,211 ft)

Population
  - Total: 5,516
  - Density: 50.88/km^{2} (131.8/sq mi)
- Demonym(s): senienc (Catalan), ceniense (Spanish)
- Postal code: 43560
- Website: lasenia.cat

La Sénia is a town and municipality in the province of Tarragona, within the autonomous community of Catalonia, Spain. It forms part of the comarca of Montsià. From the twentieth century to the present day, La Sénia has been recognized for its furniture manufacturing sector.

== Etymology ==
The name derives from the Arabic word sāniya (flour mill, waterwheel), which evolved into the Romance term azenia during the Middle Ages. The town shares its name with the Sénia River, which flows through the municipality.

== History ==
=== Prehistory ===
Material remains demonstrate the presence of human habitation in prehistoric times. The area of La Sénia has been occupied since antiquity. The caves of Rossegadors and La Tenalla contain Levantine rock art, which provides evidence of the seasonal nomadic life of small groups of humans during the Epipalaeolithic period. These paintings depict the fauna of the time, human figures engaged in hunting, details of male and female clothing, scenes of hunting activities, and compositions of indeterminate meaning.

=== Ancien Régime ===
The lands along the Sénia River remained under the jurisdiction of the Knights Hospitaller from 1178, under the command of Ulldecona Castle. It was this order that granted the first charter of settlement to Guillem de Moragues, a native of Tortosa. La Sénia, recorded in medieval charters as Cenia, was recognized as a town on 17 April 1232. Later, on 25 January 1236, Guillem de Moragues granted a charter of settlement to the inhabitants of La Sénia.

During the Catalan Civil War in 1462, La Sénia actively opposed John II of Aragon and was besieged repeatedly by royal troops until it surrendered in June 1466. In 1536, it was incorporated into the commandery of Mirambel.

In 1716, following the War of the Spanish Succession, Philip V's Nueva Planta decrees abolished the traditional local privileges and institutions of the Principality of Catalonia, integrating the municipality into the centralized administrative system of the Spanish Crown.

=== Contemporary era ===
During the Peninsular War, the town of La Sénia played a significant role. When captured alongside the rest of Montsià and Baix Ebre, it became part of the French department of Bouches-de-l'Èbre. During this period, La Sénia gained prominence for its shipbuilding industry. Following the expulsion of French forces from Montsià, absolutism was restored with the accession of Ferdinand VII to the Spanish throne.

When Spain was divided into provinces in 1833, La Sénia became part of Tarragona. That same year, the First Carlist War broke out in the region following the capture of the town by General Ramón Cabrera, leading to repeated sieges by Isabelline forces until 1840, when General Leopoldo O'Donnell defeated Cabrera.

On 18 April 1871, the Spanish noble title of Marquesado de la Cenia was created by King Amadeo I in favour of Fernando Cotoner y Chacón, who held the ranks of lieutenant general, captain general of Puerto Rico, and minister of war. On 15 August 1882, Alfonso XII elevated the title to the dignity of Grandee of Spain.

In the early twentieth century, specifically in 1907, electricity was introduced to the town.

In 1937, during the Spanish Civil War, the Spanish Republican Air Force constructed an airfield at Els Plans. Following the Aragon Offensive. Nationalist forces captured La Sénia on 14 April 1938, and the airfield became a principal operating base for the German Condor Legion during the Levante Offensive and the Battle of the Ebro. On 16 December of that year, a Republican air raid damaged the facility and destroyed several Condor Legion aircraft.

On 18 April 1984, the municipality's official name was changed from the Spanish form, Cenia, to the Catalan form, La Sénia.

== Administrative divisions ==
La Sénia is composed of two population centres.

Population by entity(2023 census)
| Population entity | Population |
|---|---|
| Els Plans | 42 |
| La Sénia | 5,581 |

== Culture ==
The most notable building is the parish church of Saint Bartholomew and Saint Roch, dedicated respectively to the traditional patron saint and to the advocate against the plague. It was built between the seventeenth and eighteenth centuries in a Baroque style with Neoclassical details. It features a single nave flanked by side chapels and a square bell tower topped with a dome. The historic centre of the village preserves a similar aesthetic, characterized by houses with prominent stone portals and balconies. In 1983, municipal planning controls were established to protect this historic quarter.

Approximately 6 kilometres (3.7 miles) from the centre of La Sénia stands the Sanctuary of the Virgin of Pallerols, situated atop Pallerols Mountain, which houses an image of the Virgin.

In 1904, the Banda Harmónica de Cenia was founded with seventy-five musicians; today known as the Agrupació Musical Senienca, it has competed in regional and international competitions, receiving the Creu de Sant Jordi in 2002. The town's principal festival takes place in August and is noted for its traditional horse races, followed in September by a pilgrimage to the Sanctuary of Pallerols.

== Economy ==
The local economy historically centred on dryland agriculture, notably the cultivation of olive trees, vineyards, and cereals. In the 1930s, brush-making factories were established. During the 1960s, the construction of the Ulldecona Dam stimulated industrial expansion, drawing migrant workers and fostering paper mills, furniture factories, metalwork fabricators, freight transport services, and construction firms.

Extra virgin olive oil extracted from local ancient olive groves is sold commercially across various markets.

The furniture sector expanded from small workshops in the 1940s and 1950s into mechanized assembly lines in the 1960s and specialized production plants by the 1970s. Today, timber processing and furniture manufacture employ the majority of the working population, establishing La Sénia as a major local employer in furniture manufacturing in Catalonia and Spain. The town hosts the Catalonia Furniture Technology Dissemination Centre (AMBIT Living Spaces Cluster) and has been formally designated a Centre of Artisanal Interest by the Government of Catalonia.

== Twin towns ==
- Cazorla, Andalusia
