= Tossal dels Tres Reis =

Mountain in Spain

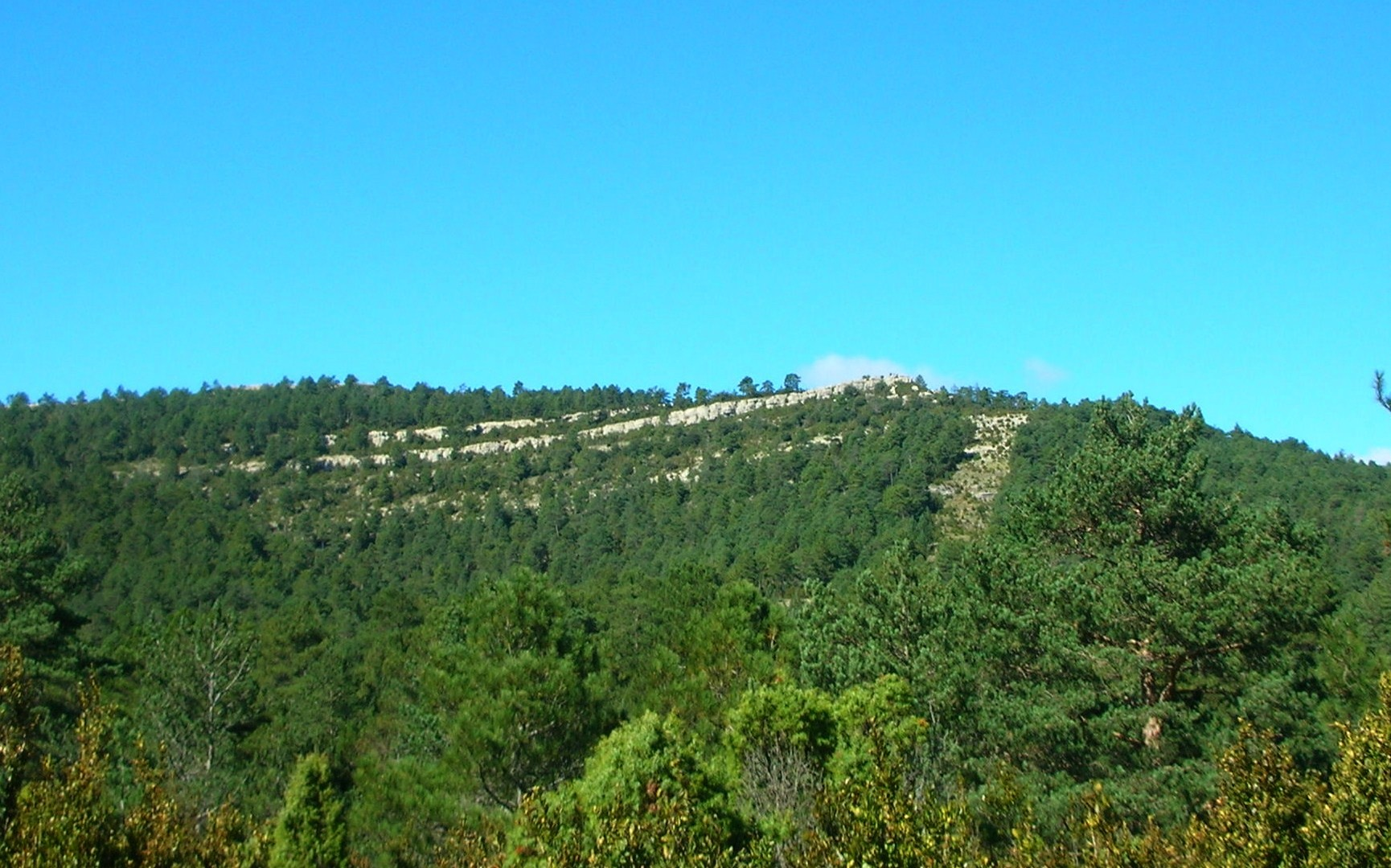
- Tossal dels Tres reis; summit seen from the Mas del Ric de Fredes located SE of the mountain

Highest point
- Elevation: 1,350 m (4,430 ft)
- Listing: Mountains of Aragon, Mountains of the Valencian Community, Mountains of Catalonia
- Coordinates: 40°48′28″N 0°19′7″E

Geography
- Location: Matarranya (Aragon); Baix Ebre (Catalonia); Baix Maestrat (Valencian Community)
- Parent range: Ports de Tortosa-Beseit

Geology
- Mountain type: Limestone

Climbing
- First ascent: Unknown
- Easiest route: From Fredes (La Pobla de Benifassà)

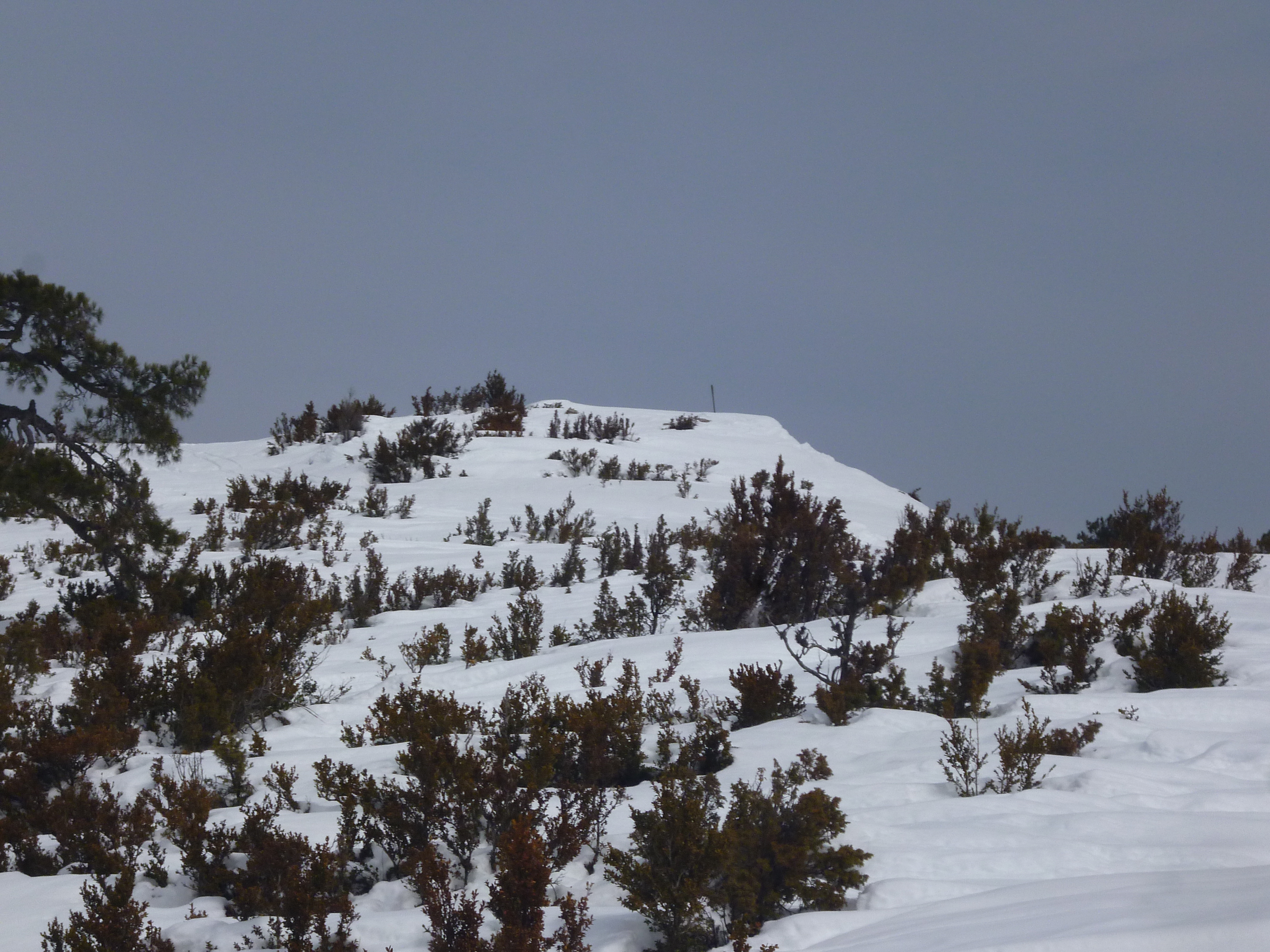
View of the mountaintop covered with snow

Tossal dels Tres Reis (Valencian pronunciation: [toˈsal dels ˈtɾez ˈrejs]) or Tossal del Rei ('Peak of the King') is a mountain of the Ports de Tortosa-Beseit massif, Spain. It has an elevation of 1,350 metres above sea level.

This mountain is one of the Emblematic Summits of Catalonia.

== Description ==
Its name means 'Peak of the Three Kings' and it is located where the borders of the ancient Kingdoms of Aragon, Valencia and Principality of Catalonia meet.

An ancient legend has it that in the days of the Moors and Christians, three monarchs - two infidels and one who feared Christ - used to meet on top of a mountain from which they could see their territories. On the summit, there is a cairn marking the place where these three kings met.

== See also ==
- Rock of the Three Kingdoms
- Cross of the Three Kingdoms
- Iberian System
  - List of mountains in Aragon
  - Mountains of Catalonia
  - Mountains of the Valencian Community
- Tinença de Benifassà
- Tripoint
