= Tripoint =

Geographical point where three areas meet

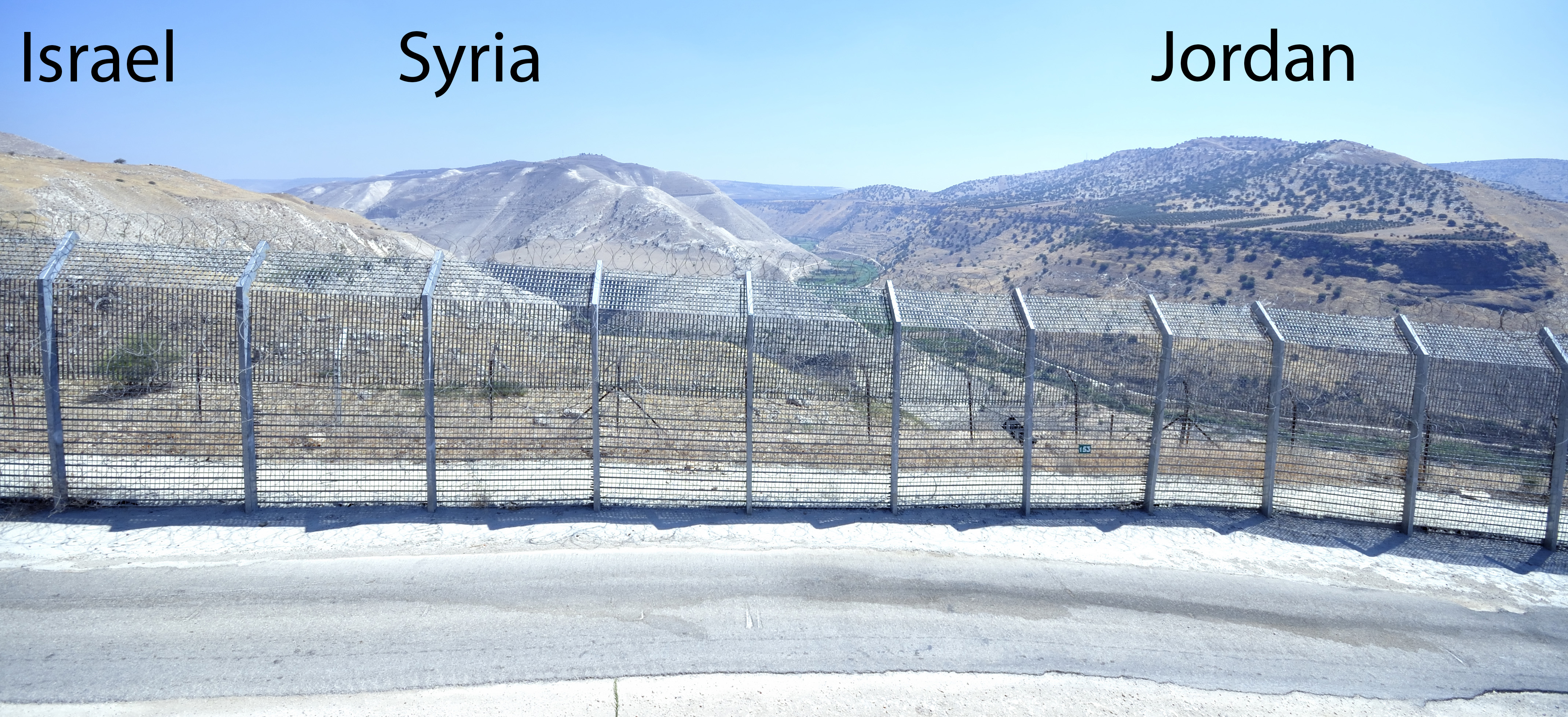
A disputed tripoint between Israel, Jordan, and Syria.

A triple border, tripoint, trijunction, triple point, or tri-border area is a geographical point at which the boundaries of three countries or subnational divisions meet. As of 2020, there are 181 international tripoints in the world. Nearly half are situated in rivers, lakes or seas. On dry land, the exact tripoints may be indicated by markers or pillars, and occasionally by larger monuments.

Usually, the more neighbours a country has, the more international tripoints that country has. China with 16 international tripoints and Russia with 11 to 14 lead the list of states by number of international tripoints. Other countries, like Brazil, India, and Algeria, have several international tripoints. Argentina has four international tripoints. South Africa, Pakistan and Nigeria have three international tripoints, Guatemala has two: one with Mexico and Belize, and one with Honduras and El Salvador; while Bangladesh and Mexico have one. Within Europe, landlocked Austria has nine tripoints, among them two with Switzerland and Liechtenstein. Island countries, such as Japan and Australia, generally have no international tripoints, although some, like Bahrain and Singapore, have tripoints in their territorial waters. Countries with only one neighbouring country, such as Portugal or Lesotho, also have no international tripoints. Landlocked countries also have international tripoints. Likewise, the United States with two neighbouring countries has no international tripoints; however, it has a number of state tripoints as well as one point where four states meet. Indonesia has no international tripoints, just like Australia and Japan. Canada, as well, which has a maritime border with two other countries, has no international tripoints; however, it has five tripoints on land where the boundaries of provinces and territories meet, and one quadripoint where four provinces and territories meet. Japan has multiple prefectural tripoints; it also has prefectural quadripoints. In addition to the United States, Canada and Indonesia, Australia also has tripoints where the boundaries of states meet.

Border junctions (or "multiple points" or "multipoints" as they are also sometimes called) are most commonly threefold. There are also a number of quadripoints, and a handful of fivefold points, as well as unique examples of sixfold, sevenfold, and eightfold points (see quadripoint § Multipoints of greater numerical complexity). The territorial claims of six countries converge at the South Pole in a point of elevenfold complexity, though this is an example of points subject to dispute.

== Examples ==
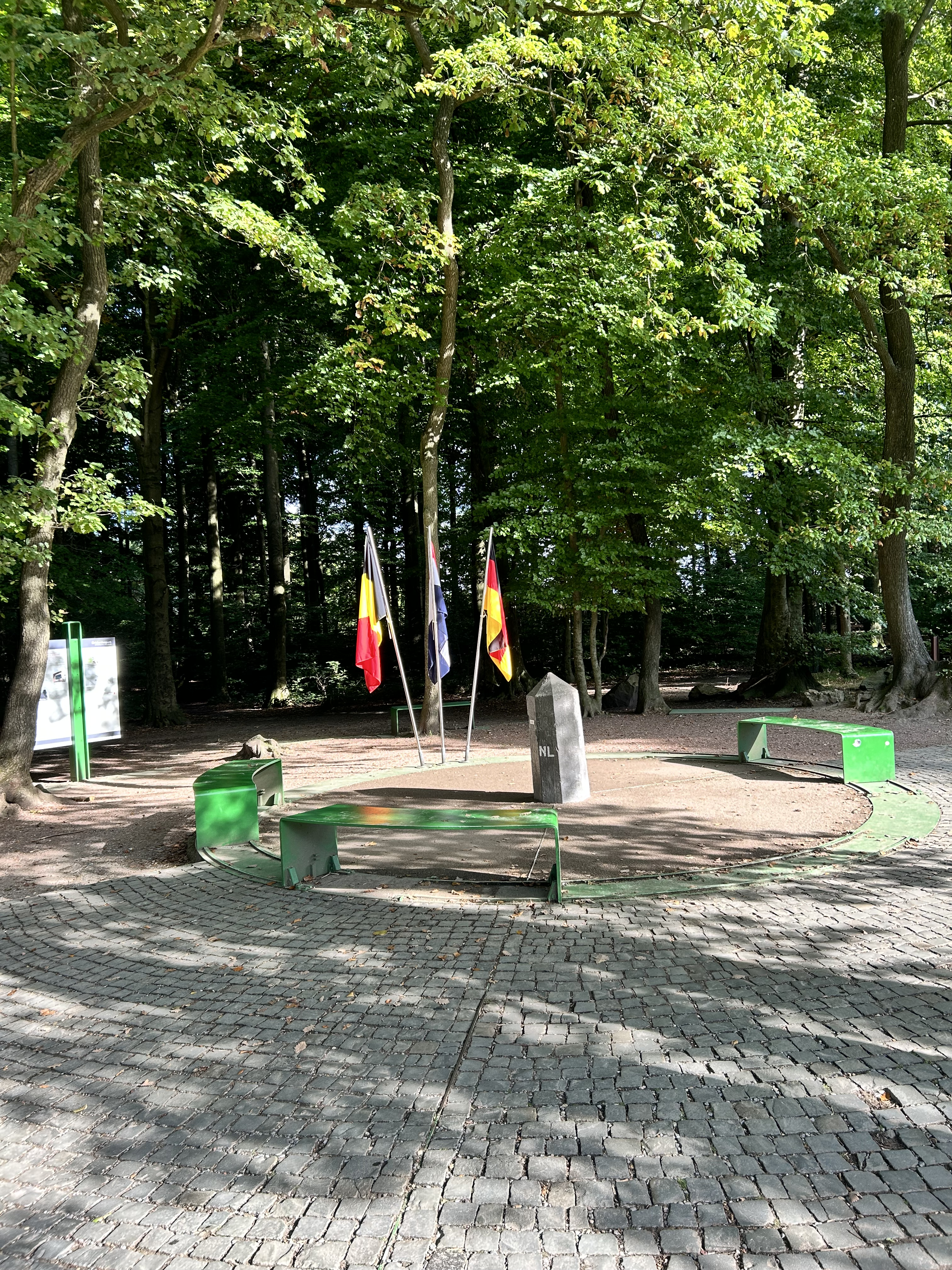
Vaalserberg: Tripoint (Germany / Netherlands / Belgium)

International tripoints include:

- the Treriksröset of Finland, Norway, and Sweden (the northernmost international tripoint in the world; the exact point is in a lake, but a marker is built on that point)
- the Vaalserberg of the Netherlands, Germany, and Belgium
- the "Dreiländereck" of Germany, France, and Switzerland (the exact point is in the river and the marker is not on the exact point)
- the Schengen tripoint of Germany, France, and Luxembourg (where the Schengen Agreement was signed on board a boat, since the tripoint is in the river)
- the summit of Sia Kangri (near Indira Col) is the tripoint where territories administered by India, Pakistan, and China meet
- the Triple Frontier of Argentina, Brazil, and Paraguay
- the Tres Fronteras of Brazil, Peru, and Colombia
- the Mont Dolent of Italy, France, and Switzerland (the exact point is not at the peak but around 200 metres (700 ft) to the northwest)
- the Trójstyk of Poland, Czech Republic and Slovakia
- Mount Roraima, where Venezuela (not recognized by this one), Brazil, and Guyana all meet
- Jongsong Peak, the eastern tripoint of China, India and Nepal
- The Trifinio Fraternidad Transboundary Biosphere Reserve is a natural reserve shared between Honduras, Guatemala and El Salvador.
- Bratislava is the only capital city in the world which is located at a tripoint: Slovakia, Hungary, and Austria. The city's administrative area extends to the tripoint, but the point lies outside of urban Bratislava itself.
- Mount Sabyinyo's third and highest peak is the intersection between Uganda, Rwanda, and the Democratic Republic of the Congo.

Some historic tripoints:

- the historic Three Emperors' Corner of Austria-Hungary, the Russian Empire, and German Empire
- the historic Piz da las Trais Linguas (Ortler Alps) of Austria-Hungary, the Kingdom of Italy, and Switzerland
- the historic Rock of the Three Kingdoms between the former kingdoms of Galicia, León, and Portugal (now part of the border between Kingdom of Spain and the Portuguese Republic)
- the Tossal dels Tres Reis ('Peak of the Three Kings'), located where the borders of the ancient Kingdoms of Aragon, Valencia and Principality of Catalonia meet

== International agreements ==
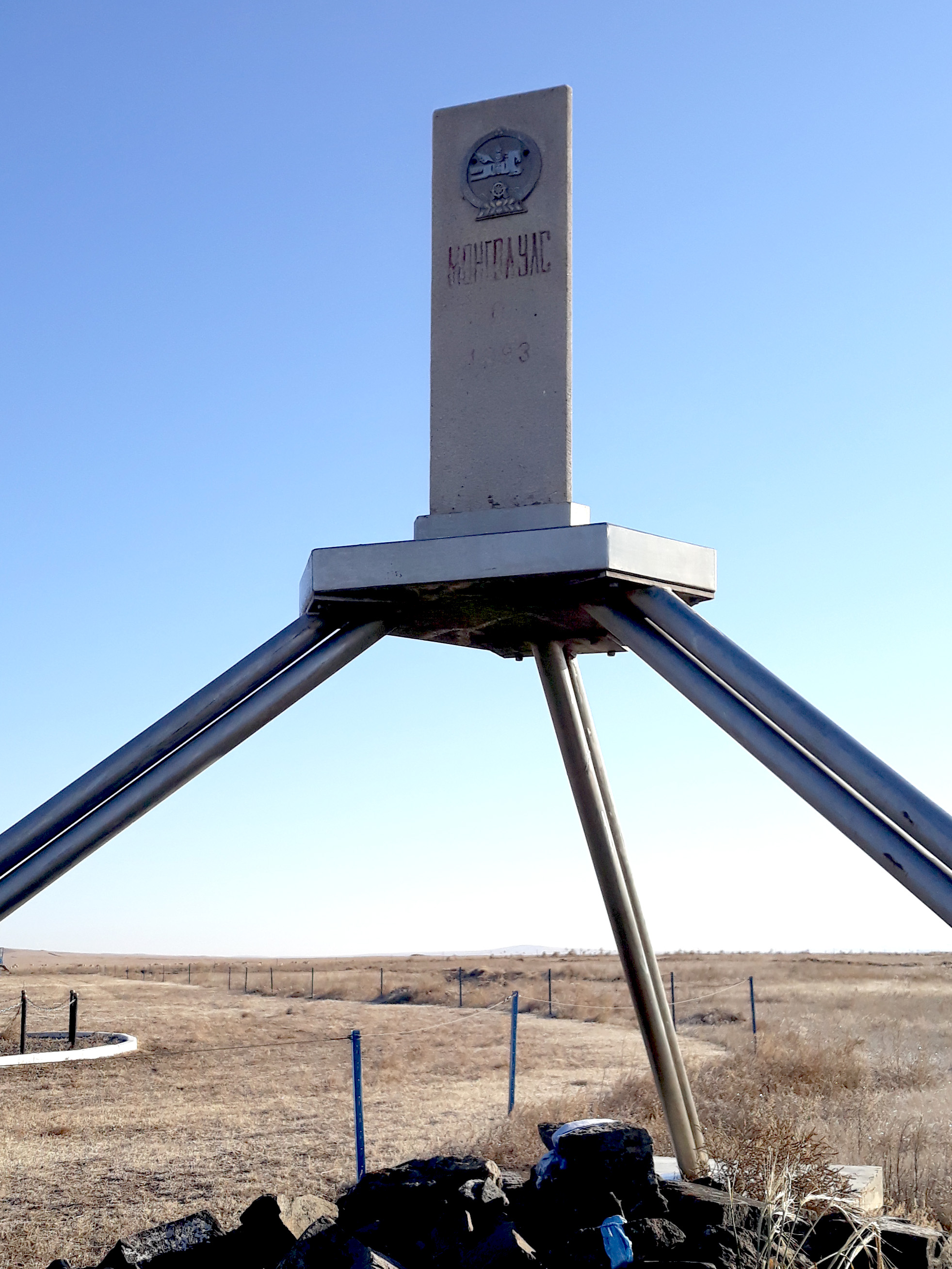
Marker at the Tarvagan Dakh Mongolia/Russia/China tripoint in 2020, from the Mongolian side

While the exact line of an international border is normally fixed by a bilateral treaty, the position of the tripoints may need to be settled by a trilateral agreement. For example, China, Russia, and Mongolia have set the position of the two relevant tripoints (the junction points of the China–Russia border, the Mongolia–Russia border, and the China–Mongolia border) by the trilateral agreement signed in Ulaanbaatar on January 27, 1994. The agreement specified that a marker was to be erected at the eastern tripoint, called Tarvagan Dakh (Tarbagan Dakha), but that no marker would be erected at the western tripoint (which was defined as the peak of the mountain Tavan-Bogdo-Ula (Kuitunshan, Tavan Bogd Uul).

== Gallery ==
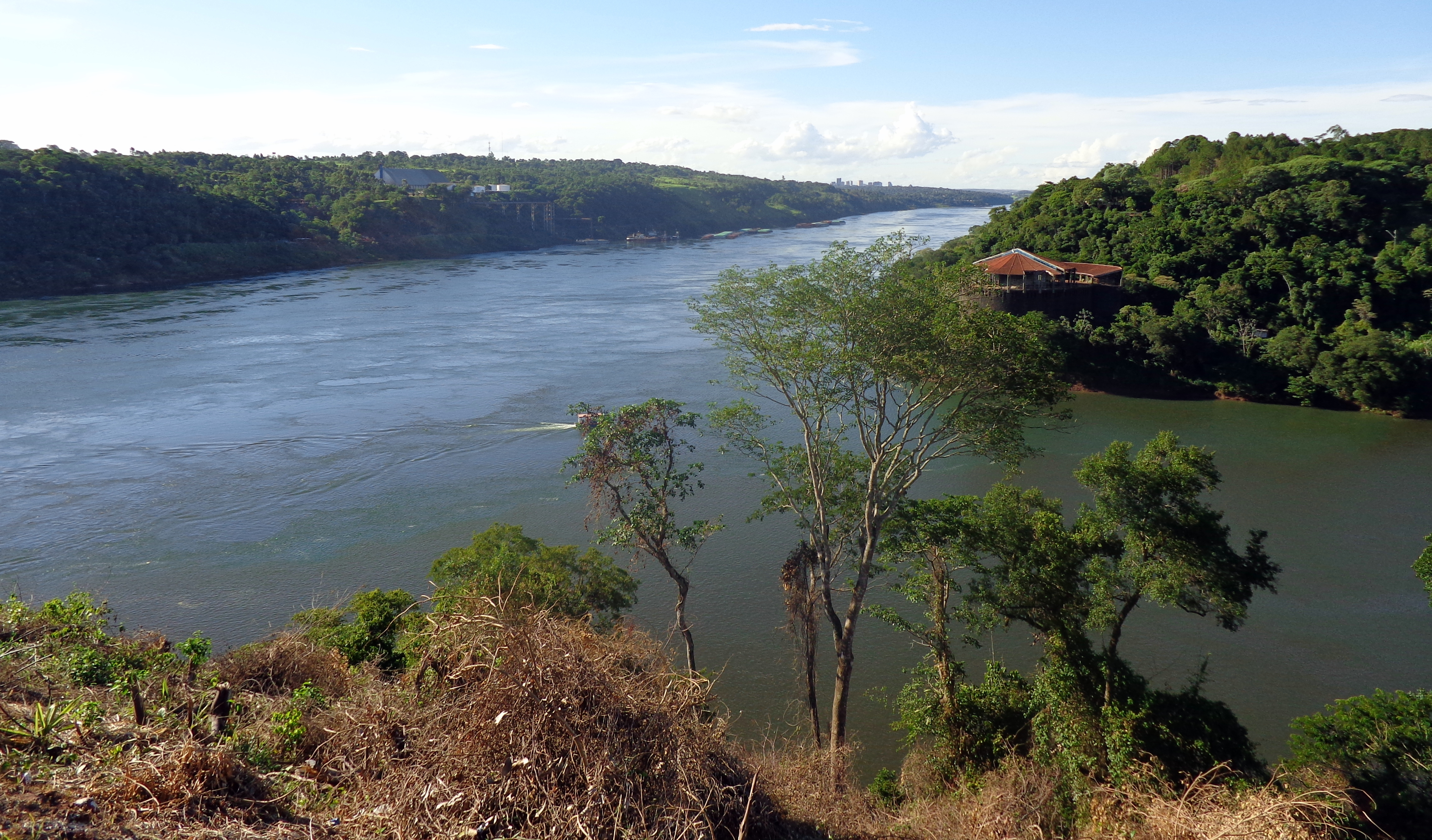
The confluence of the Iguazú and Paraná rivers is the tripoint between Brazil, Paraguay and Argentina.

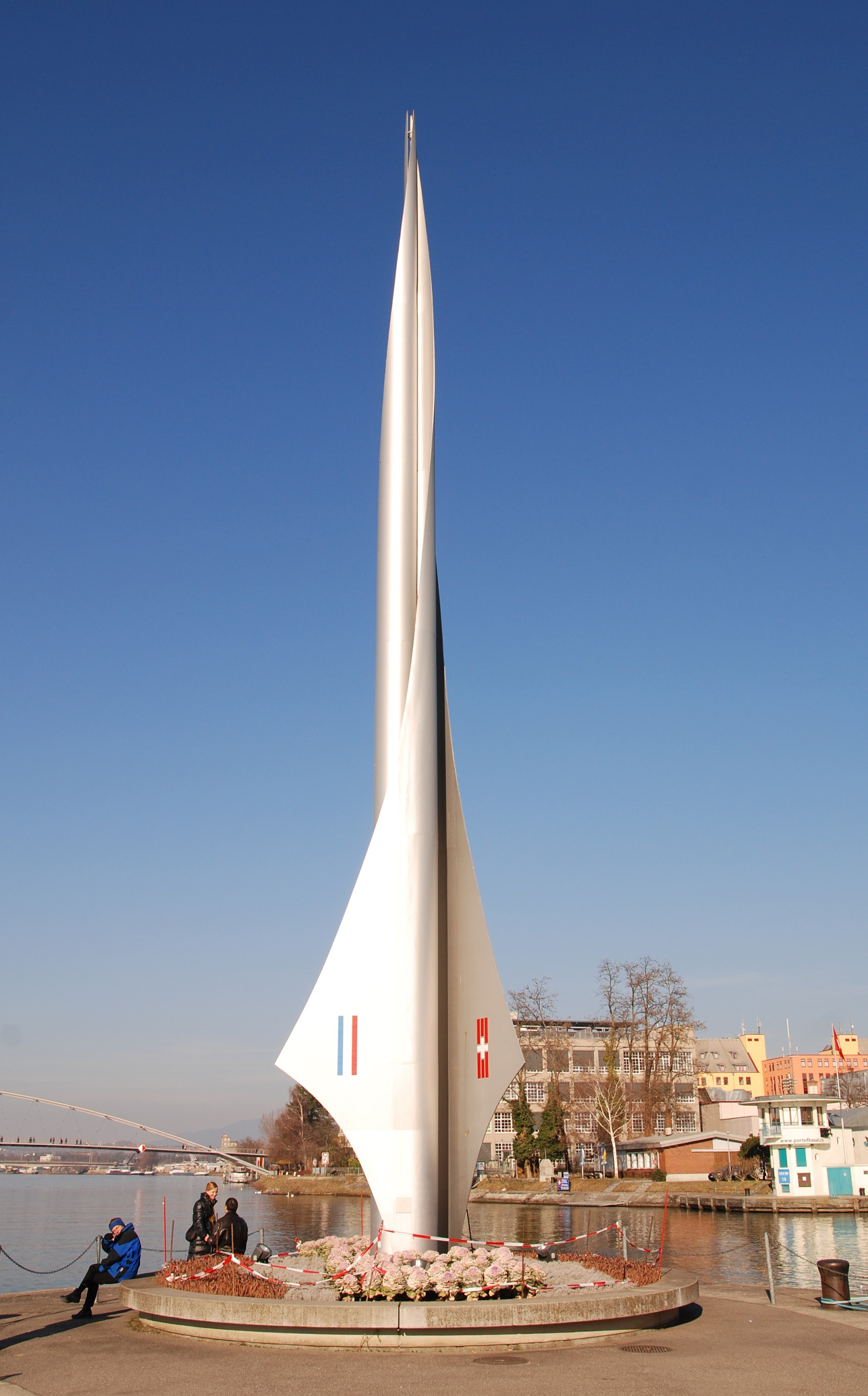
Dreiländereck Basel: Switzerland, Germany, and France

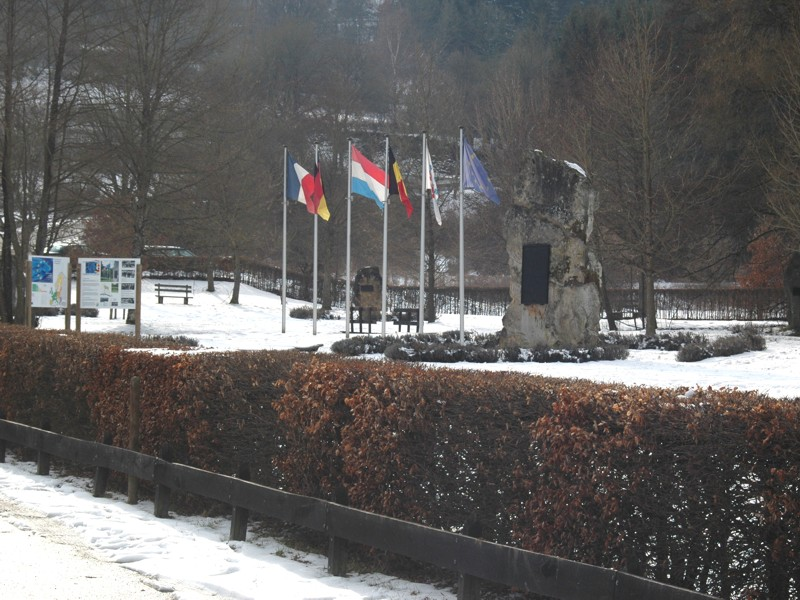
Europadenkmal: Germany, Belgium, and Luxembourg

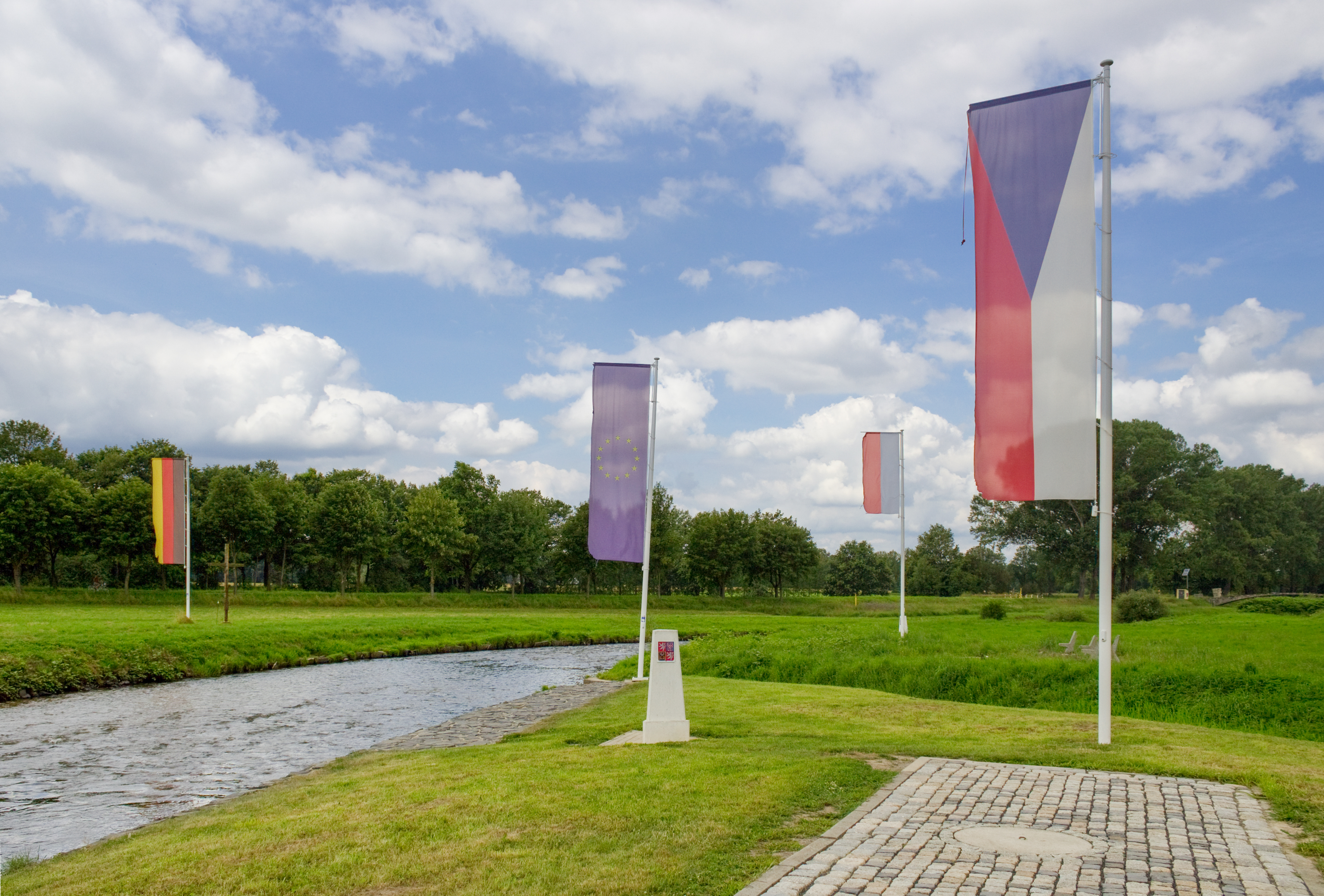
Tripoint of Germany, Czech Republic, and Poland in Sudetes

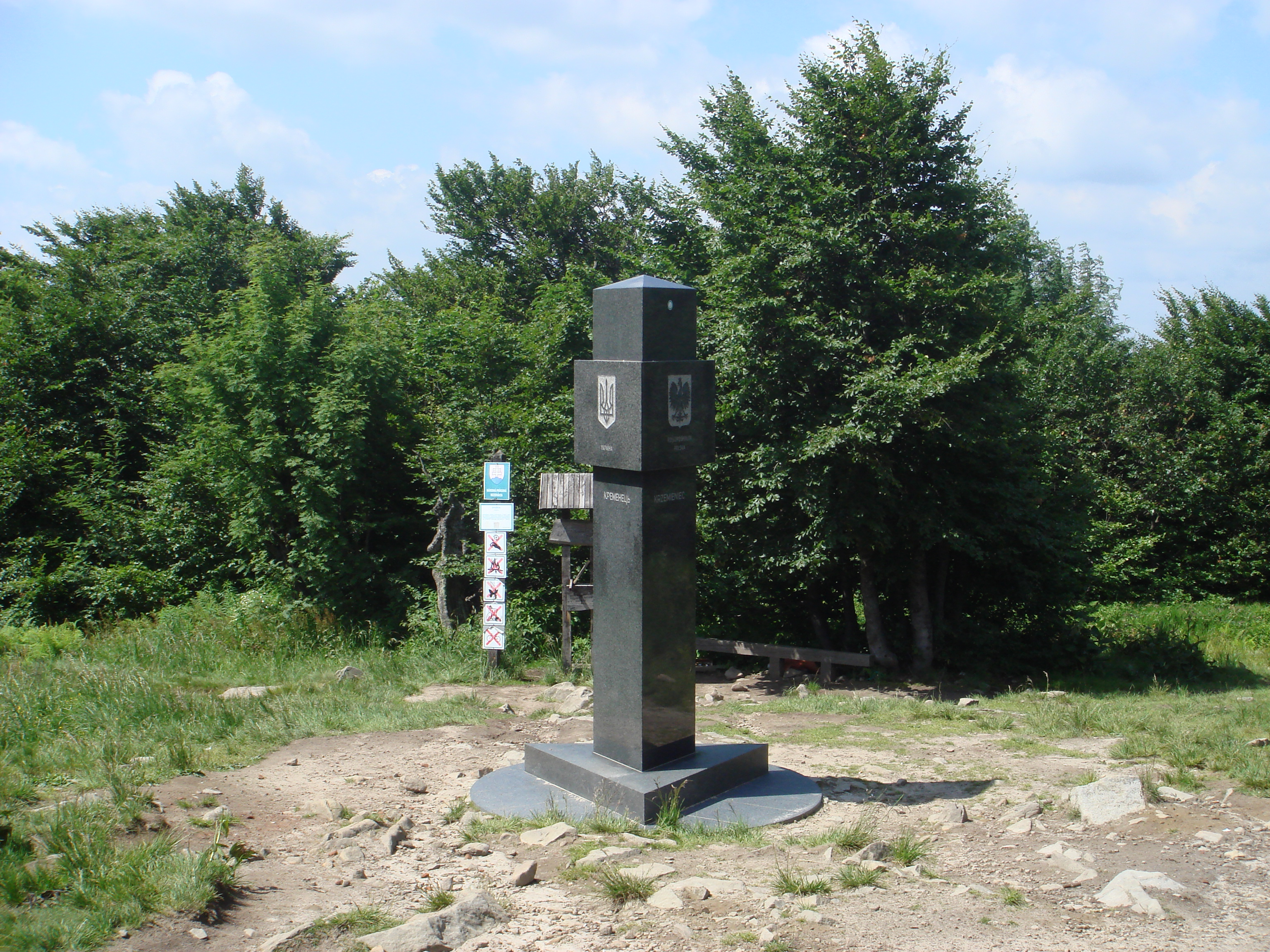
Border stone on the tripoint of Poland (right of photograph), Slovakia, and Ukraine (left)

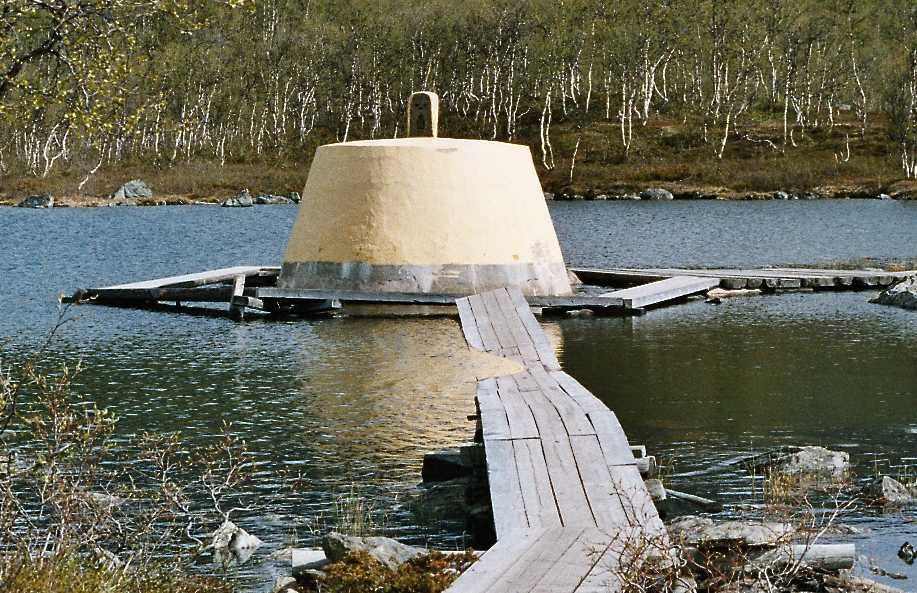
Treriksröset: Finland, Norway, and Sweden tripoint

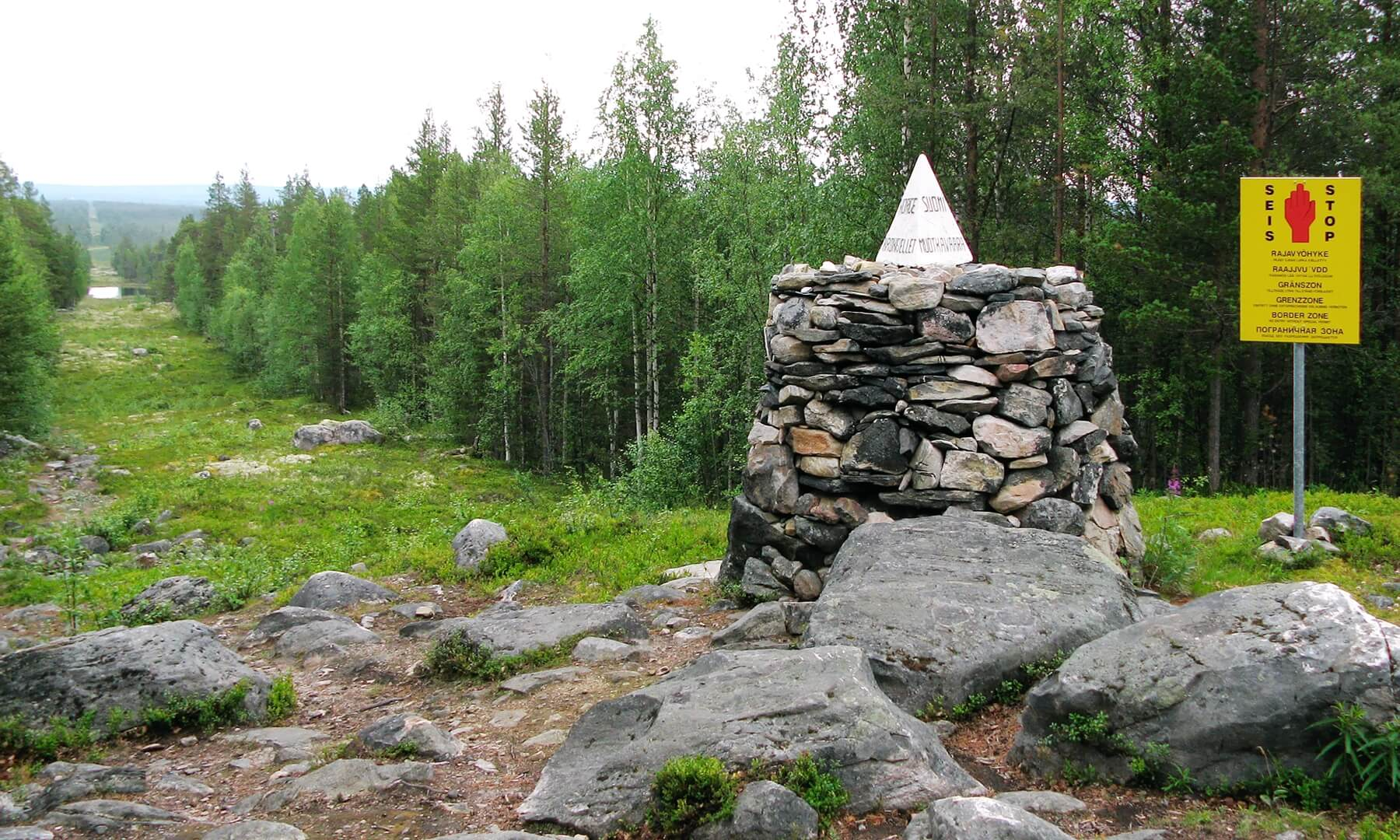
Tripoint of Russia, Norway, and Finland

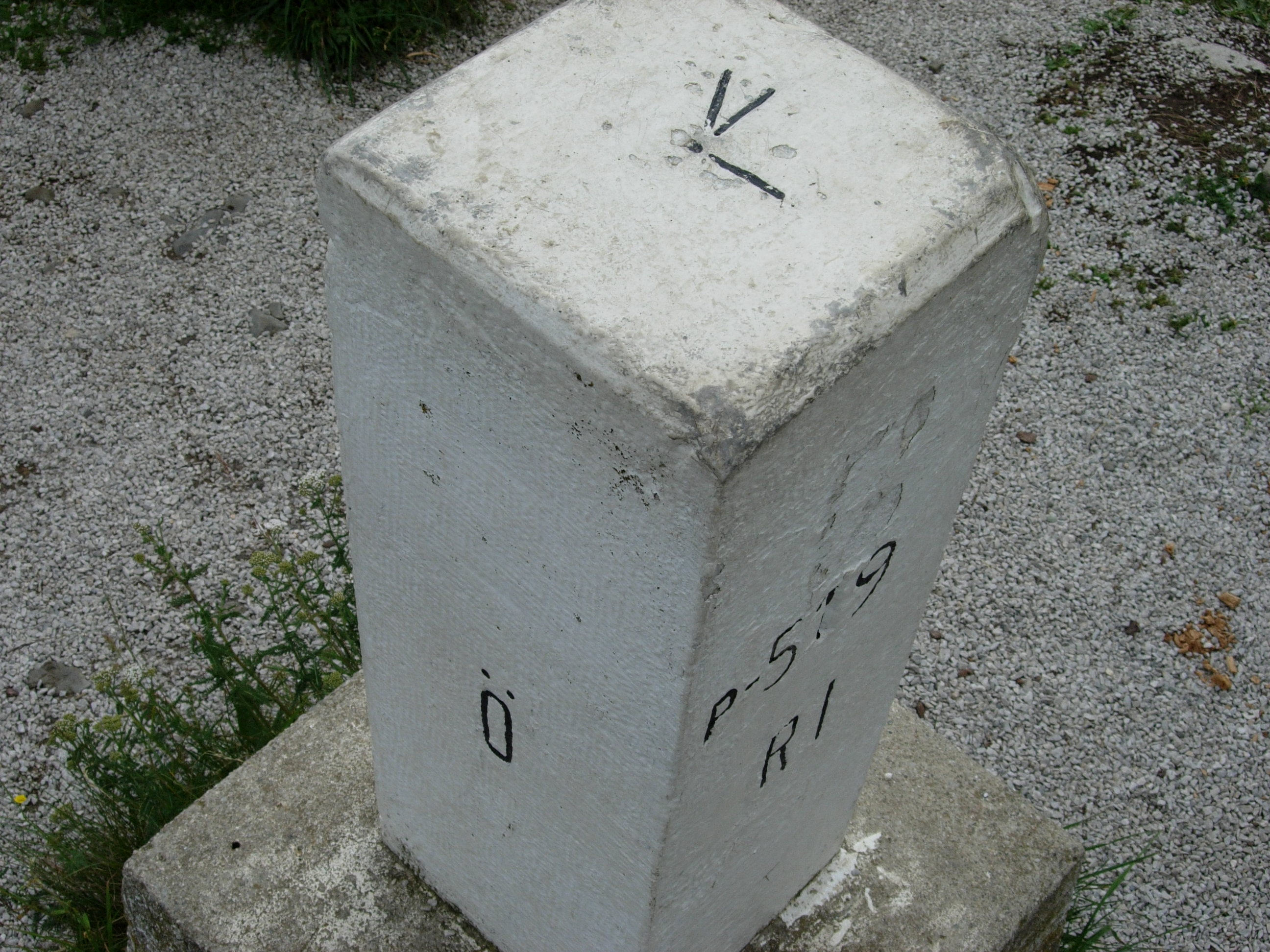
Arnoldstein: Italy, Slovenia, and Austria tripoint

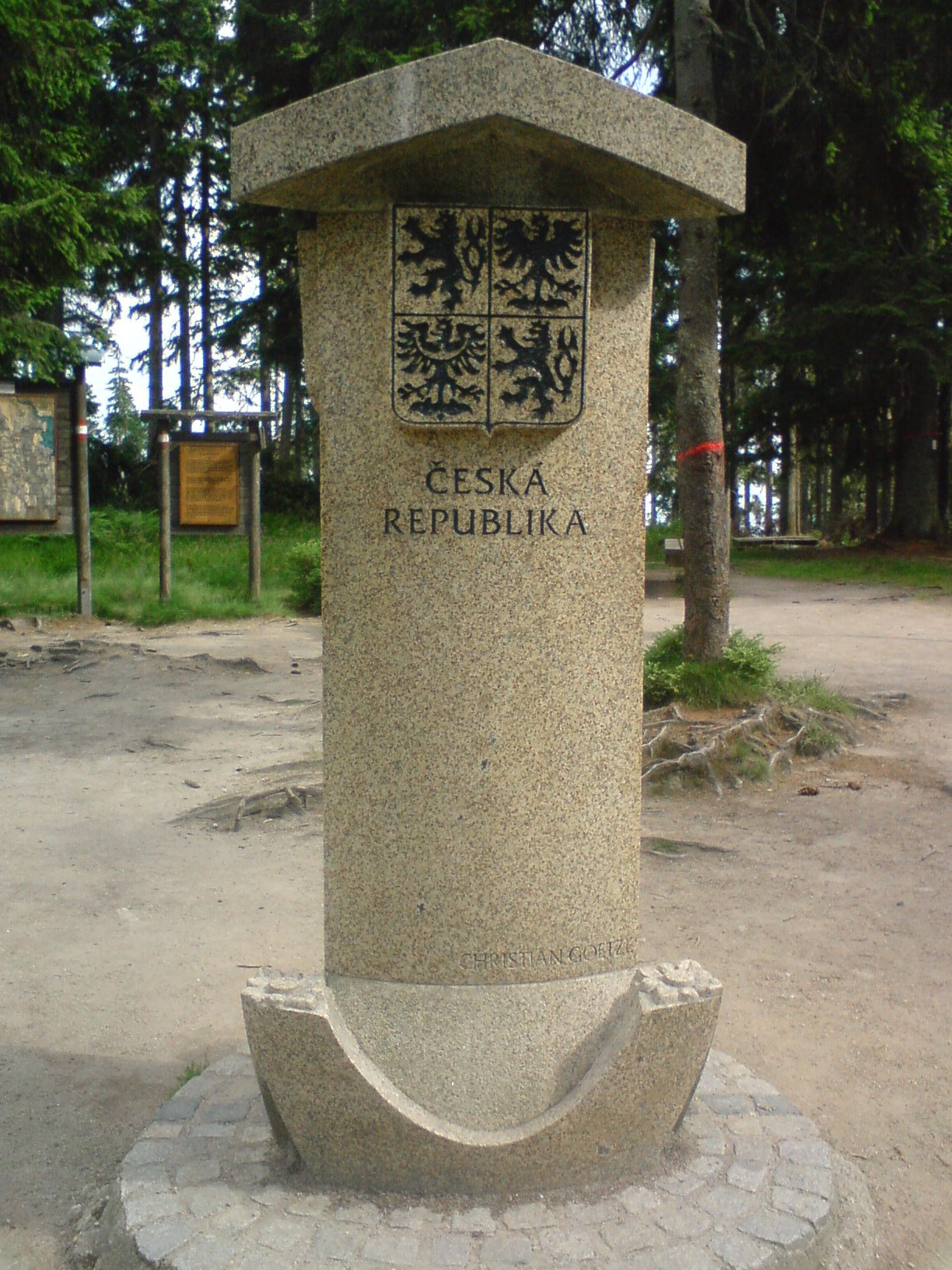
Border stone on the tripoint of the Czech Republic (foreground), Austria, and Germany

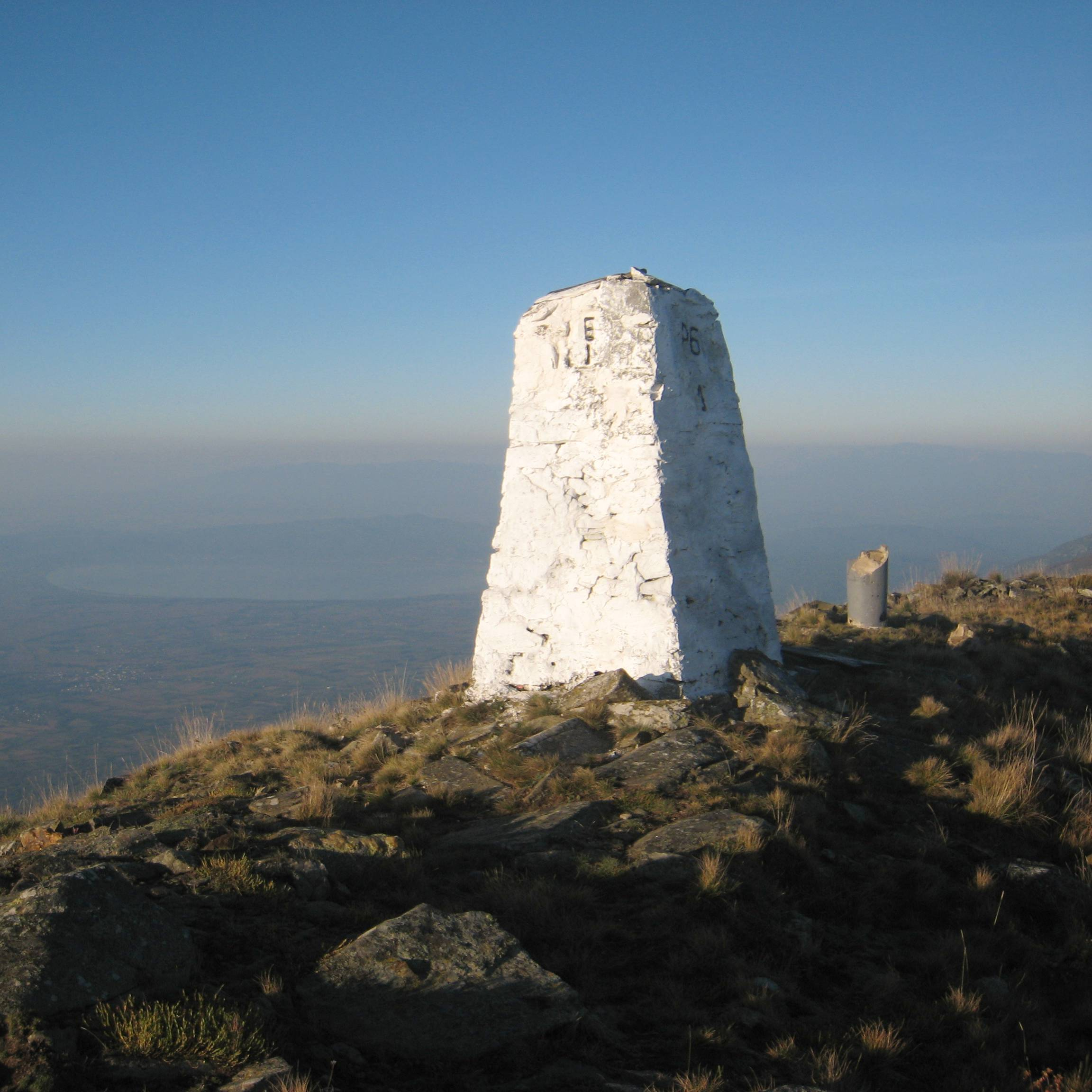
Border stone on the tripoint of Bulgaria (right of photograph), Greece (left), and North Macedonia, located on the Tumba Peak

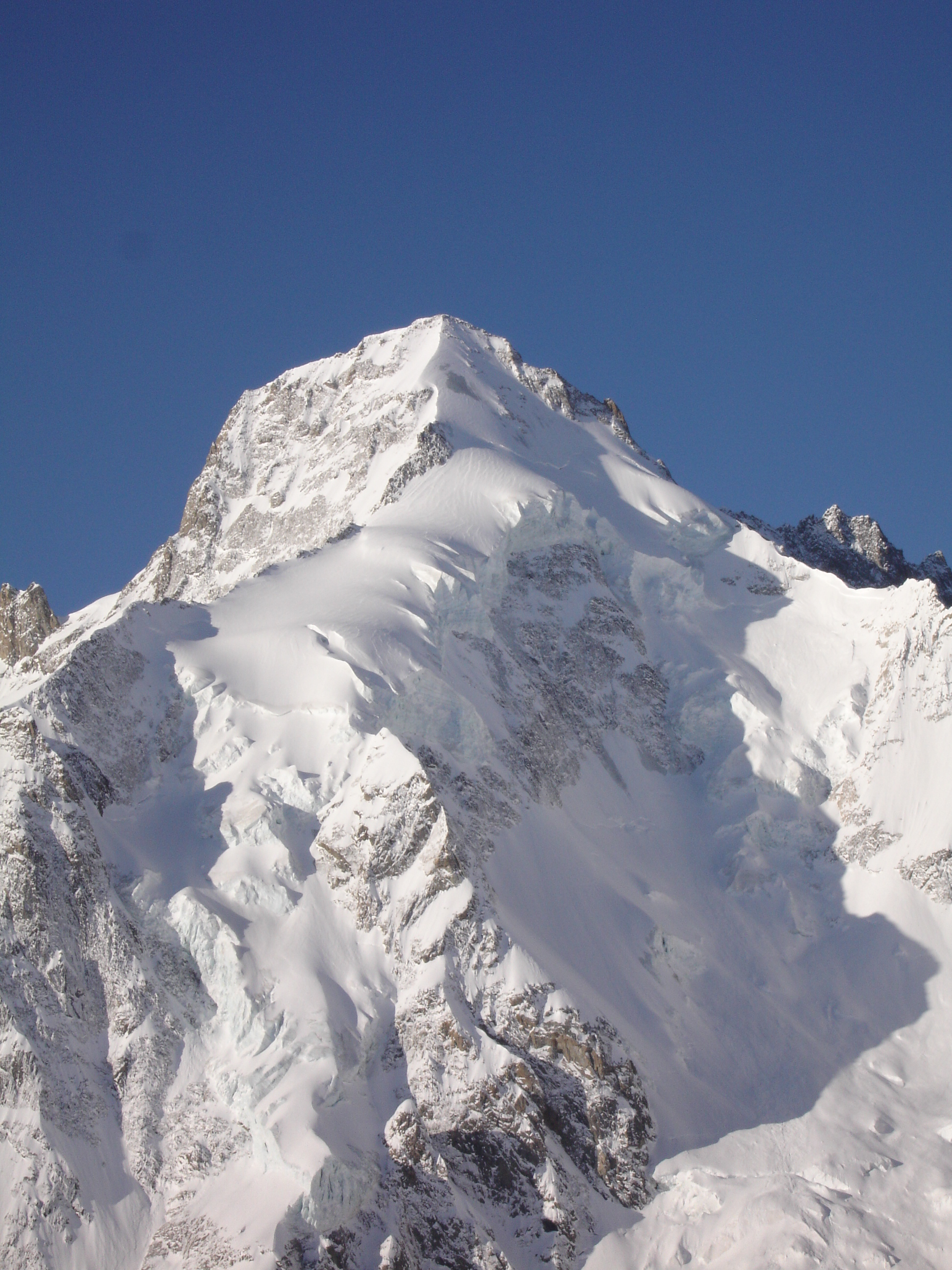
The tripoint of France, Italy, and Switzerland is located on Mont Dolent.

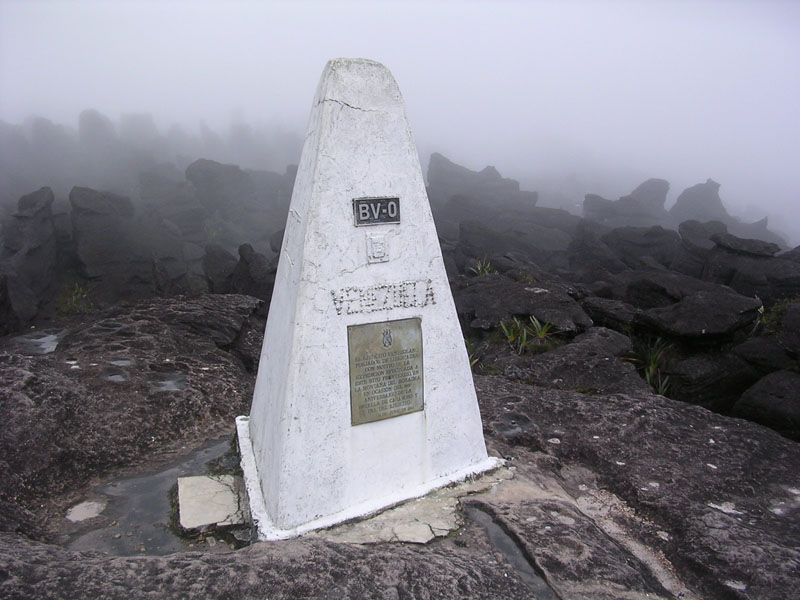
Border stone on the tripoint of Venezuela (foreground), Brazil, and Guyana located on Mount Roraima

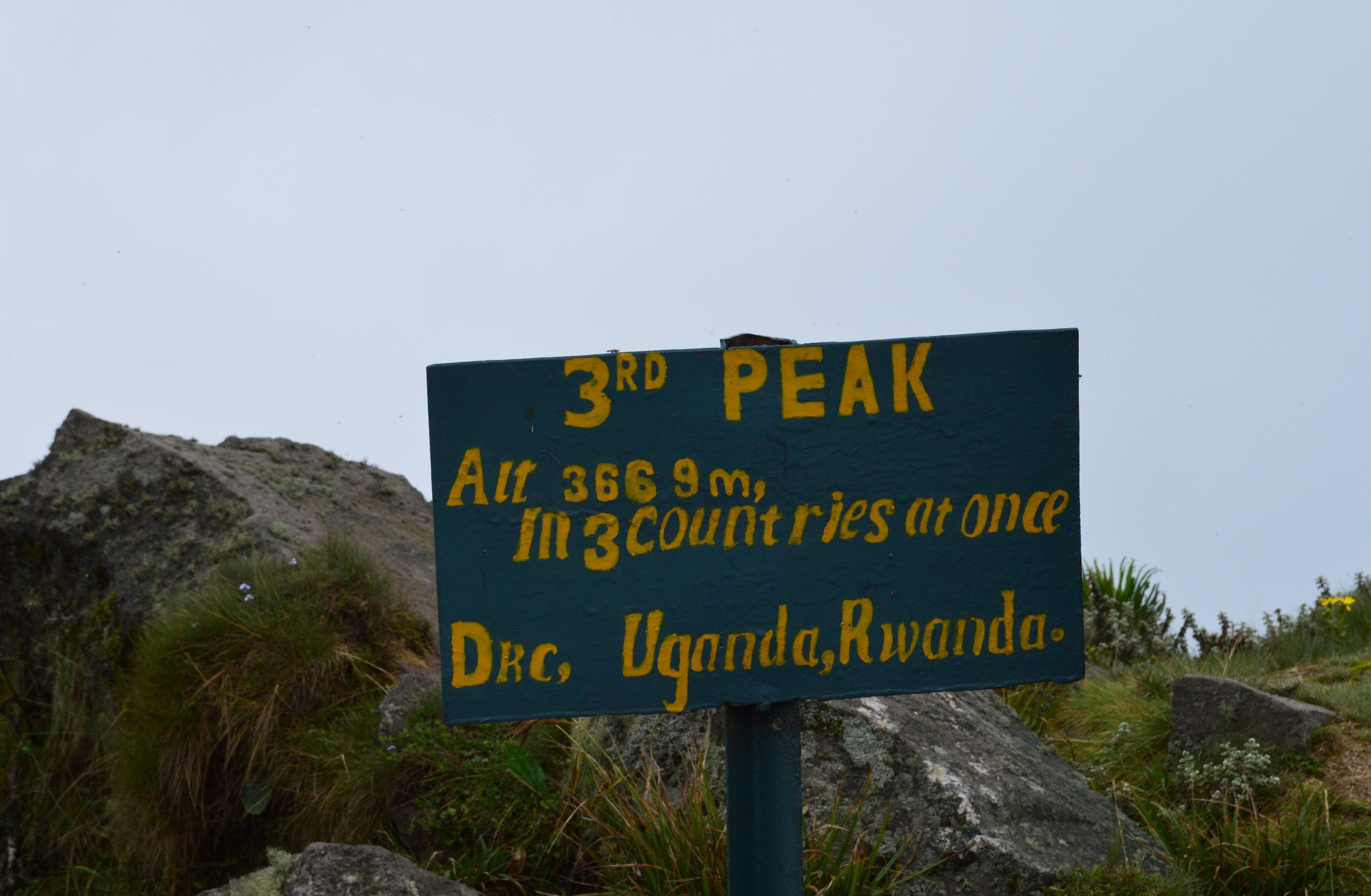
3rd peak of Mount Sabyinyo, tripoint of Uganda, Rwanda, and DRC

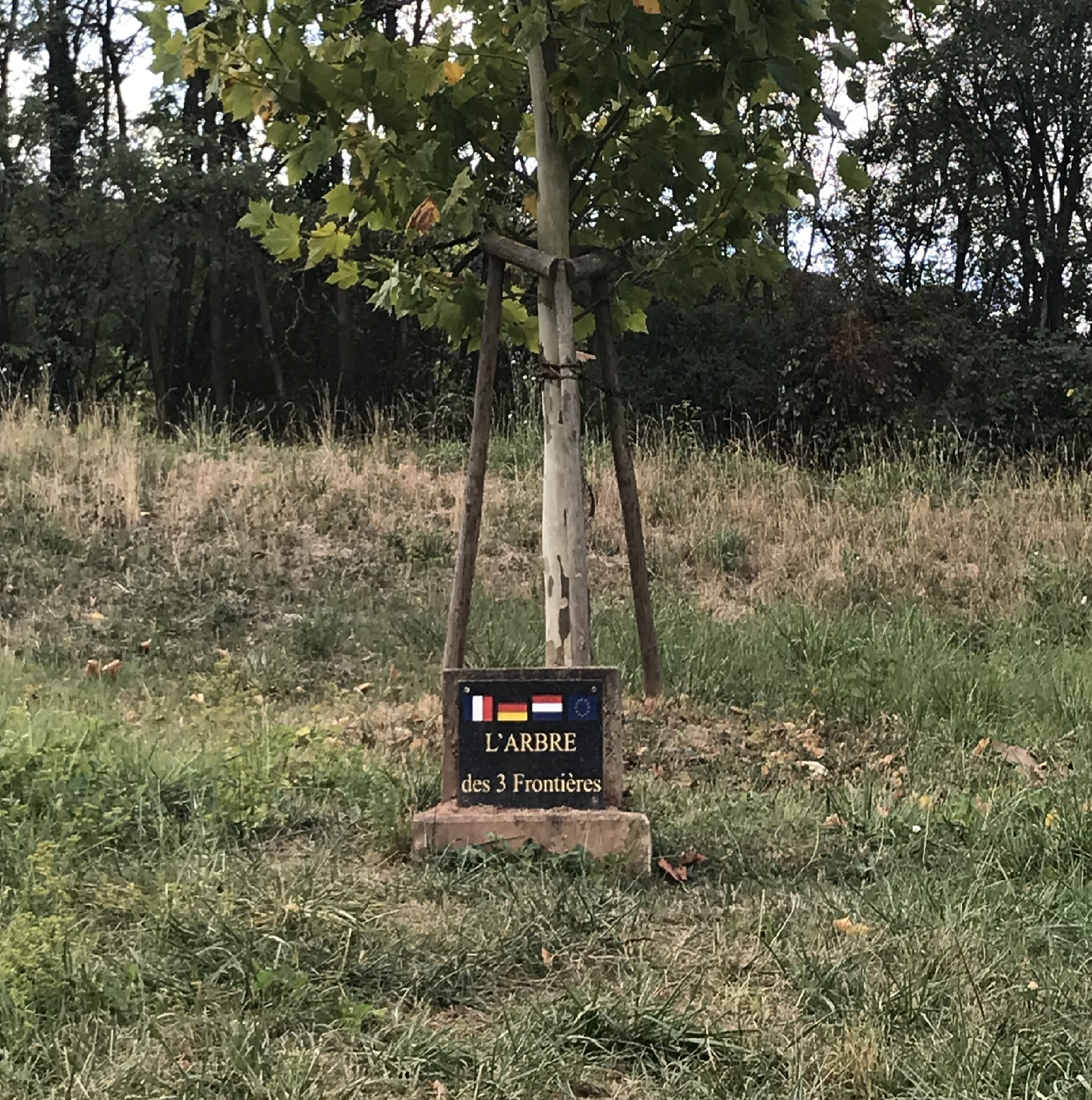
Ceremonial marker near the tri-point of France, Germany and Luxembourg

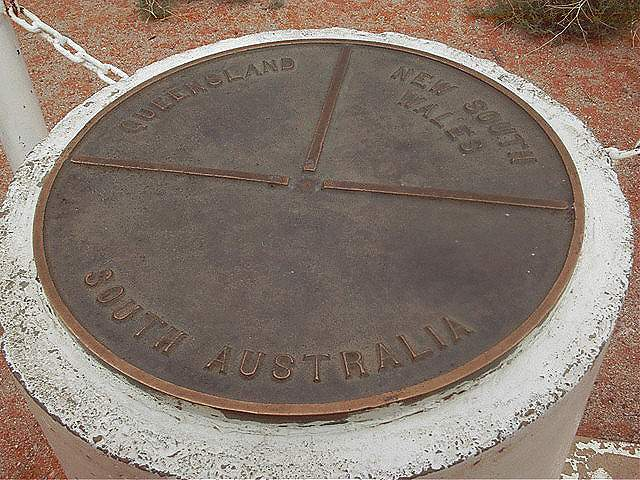
Cameron Corner Survey Marker, the point where the borders of the Australian states of New South Wales, Queensland and South Australia meet

== See also ==
- List of tripoints
- List of tripoints of counties of England
- List of tripoints of U.S. states
- Maritime boundary
- Quadripoint
