= Rock of the Three Kingdoms =

Mountain in Portugal

- Penedo dos Três Reinos (Portuguese)
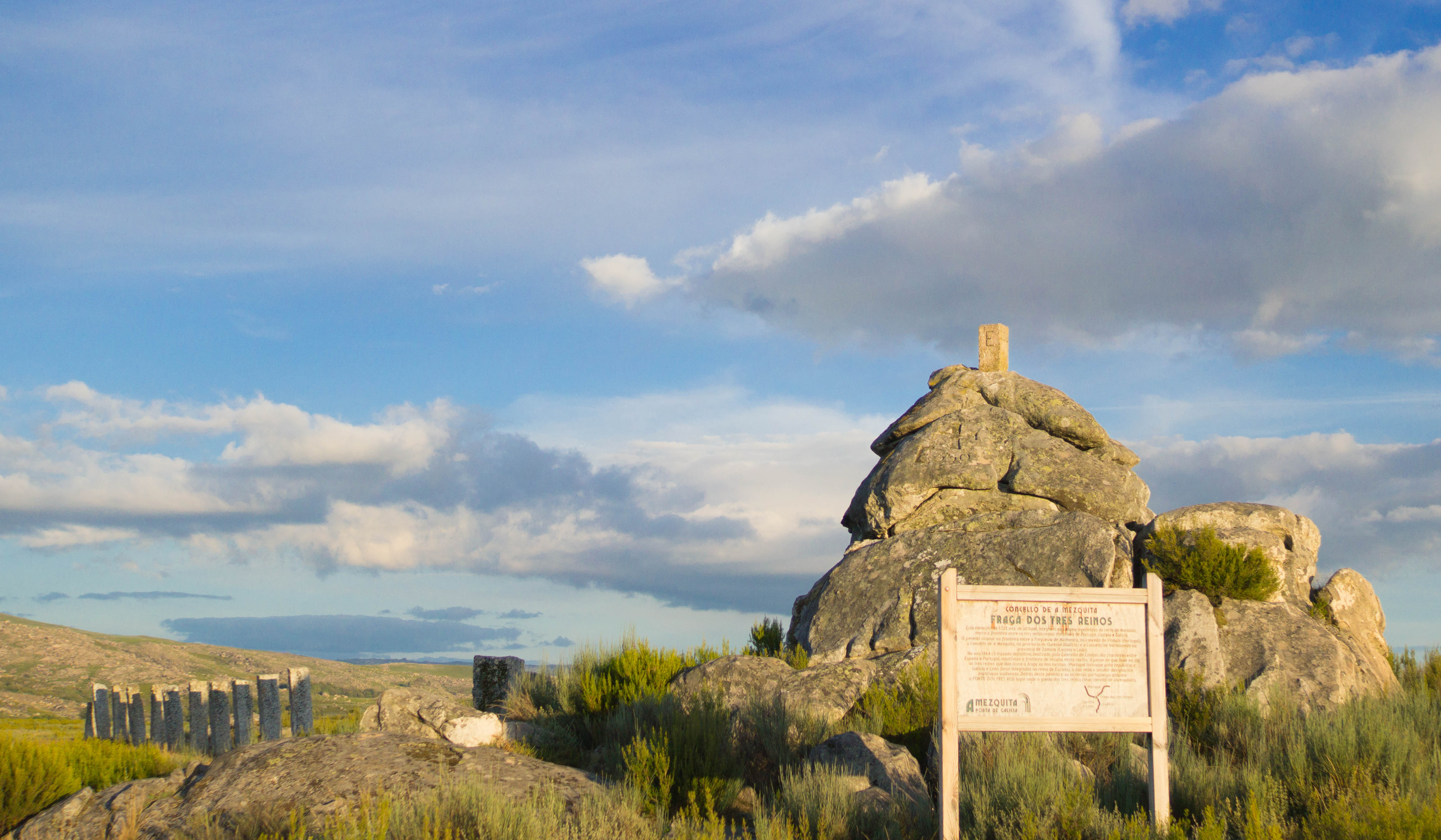
- View of the summit

Highest point
- Elevation: 1,025 m (3,363 ft)
- Coordinates: 41°58′20″N 6°58′57″W

Geography
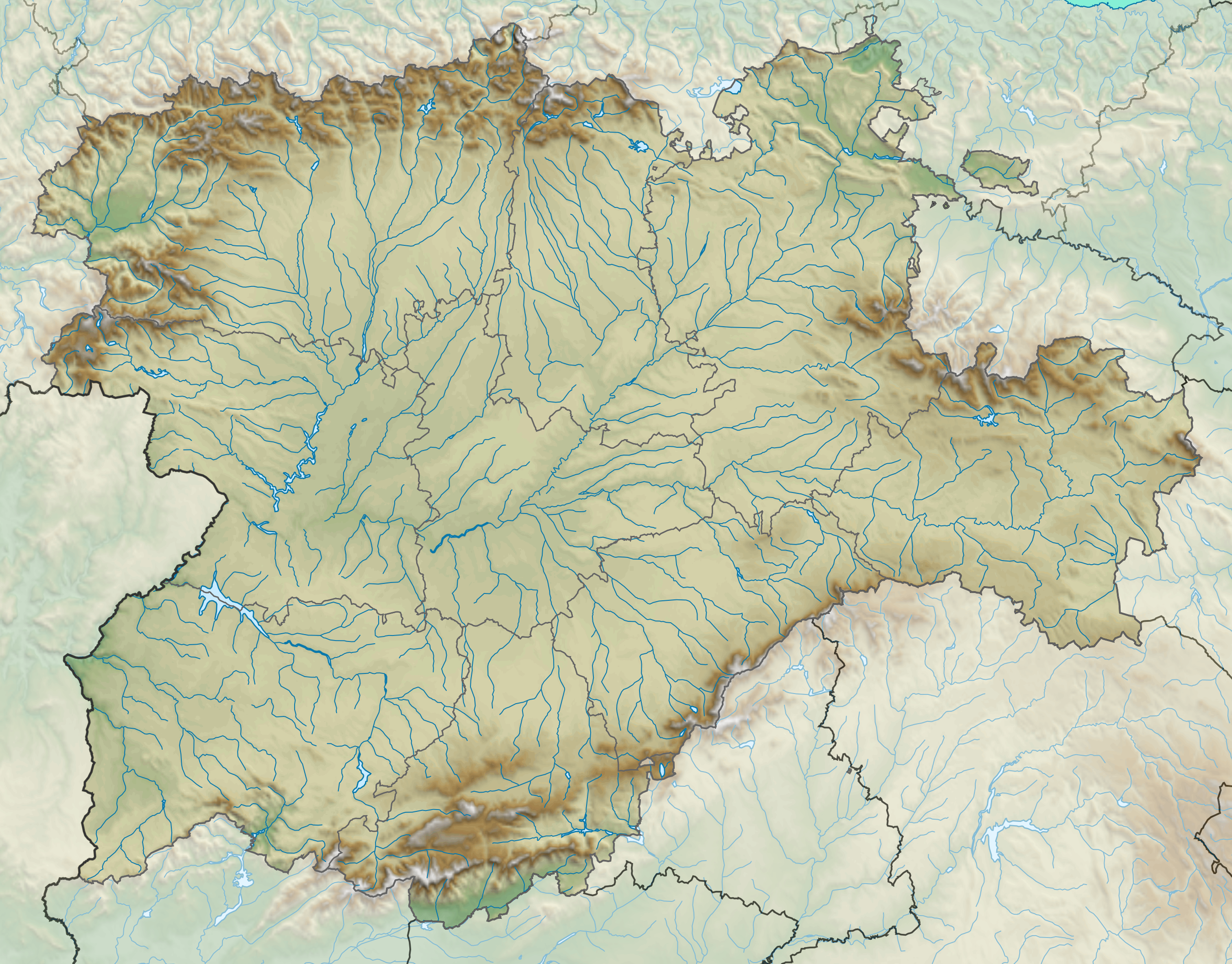
- Location within Spain Location within Portugal Location within Castile and León Location within Galicia
- Location: Location of the mountain in the border area between Portugal and Spain
- Parent range: Serra da Coroa (Sierra de la Culebra)

Geology
- Mountain type: Slate

Climbing
- First ascent: Unknown
- Easiest route: From Moimenta, Vinhais

The Rock of the Three Kingdoms (Portuguese: Penedo dos Três Reinos) is a mountain of 1025 m of elevation in the Serra de Marabón (Spanish: Sierra del Marabón), part of the mountainous system of Sierra de la Culebra (Portuguese: Serra da Coroa).

== Description and location ==
Known also as Fragua dos Tres Reinos in Galician, this rocky formation was the former tripoint between the three ancient medieval kingdoms of Portugal, León, and Galicia, hence its name.

The Penedo is located on the border between the village of Moimenta in the municipality of Vinhais, the municipality of A Mezquita in province of Ourense (Autonomous Community of Galicia) and the municipality of Hermisende in Senabria comarca of the province of Zamora (Autonomous Community of Castile and León). There are Iberian wolves in this area.

== See also ==
- Tossal dels Tres Reis
- Cross of the Three Kingdoms
- Tripoint
