= Cross of the Three Kingdoms =

Coordinates: 40.1389°N 1.4528°W

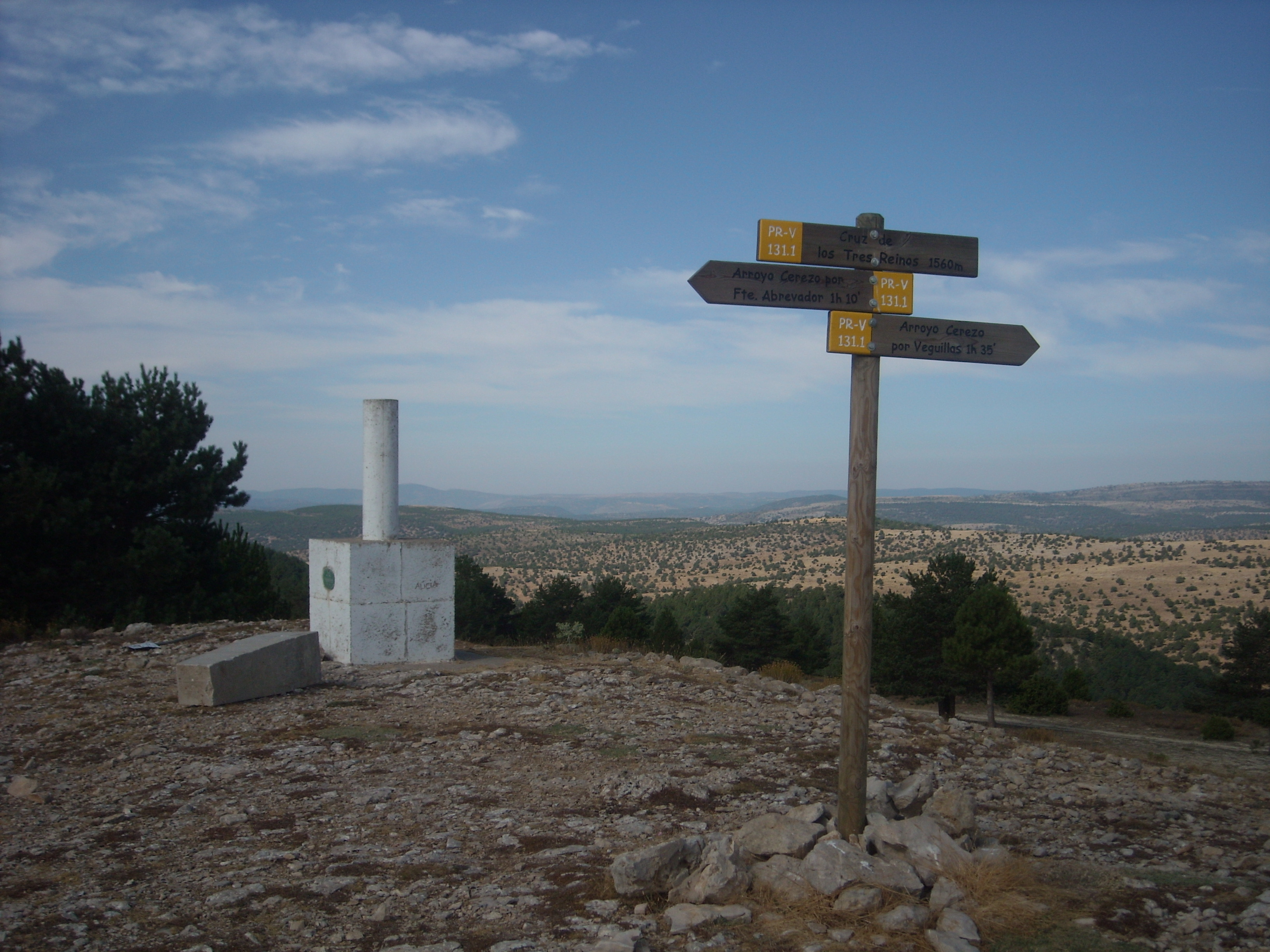

The Cross of the Three Kingdoms (in Spanish Cruz de los Tres Reinos) is a hill near the civil parish of Arroyo Cerezo, which is part of the municipality of Castielfabib in the comarca of the Rincón de Ademuz, province of Valencia (Valencian Community). It is part of the Montes Universales mountain range. This rise has an elevation of 1,555 m.

== Etymology ==
This site is so-named because it once formed the border intersection of three kingdoms: the Kingdom of Aragon, the Kingdom of Valencia, and the Kingdom of Castile. Tradition holds that in the medieval era, the kings of both crowns (the king of Castile, and the king of Aragon, who was also king of Valencia), met in that location to discuss their mutual issues.

== Bibliography ==
- Montesinos, J. y Poyato, C. (Ed.): Actas del Primer Simposio de La Cruz de los Tres Reinos. Espacio y tiempo en un territorio de frontera. Simposio Interregional Interuniversitario, celebrado en Ademuz el 25, 26 y 27 de julio de 2008. Edición de la Universitat de València y de la Universidad de Castilla-La Mancha. Cuenca, 2011. ISBN 978-84-8427-773-6.

== See also ==
- Rock of the Three Kingdoms
- Tossal dels Tres Reis
