= Antonio García-Santesmases =

Spanish politician

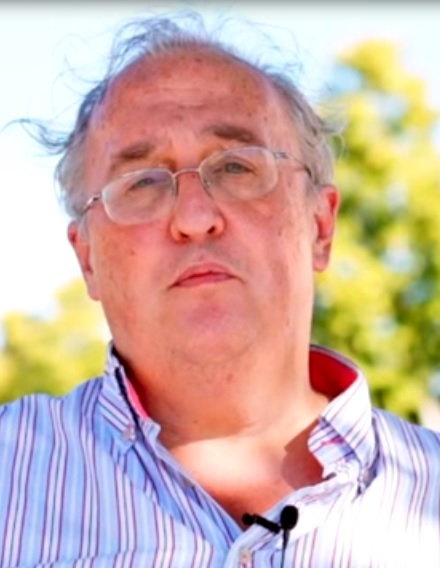
- In 2015

Members of the Congress of Deputies
- In office 26 March 1996 – 18 January 2000

Personal details
- Born: 1954; Madrid
- Citizenship: Spanish
- Political party: PSOE
- Occupation: Political philosopher, politician, university professor

Antonio Juan García-Santesmases Martín-Tesorero (born 1954) is a Spanish political philosopher and politician.

== Biography ==
Born in 1954 in Madrid, son to a well-off family, he studied in the Colegio de Nuestra Señora del Recuerdo.

Graduated in university studies in Philosophy and Arts in 1975, since 1979 he worked as highschool teacher, meanwhile he was preparing his PhD thesis, titled Marxism and State, a work he presented in 1983. He took an active role in the Izquierda Socialista faction within the Spanish Socialist Workers' Party (PSOE), and was a member of the PSOE Federal Committee from 1984 to 1997.

He ran 10th in the PSOE list in Madrid for the 1996 general election, and was elected legislator. He served as member of the Congress of Deputies from 26 March 1996 to 18 January 2000.

He became a professor of Political philosophy at the National University of Distance Education (UNED).

== Works ==
Author

- Antonio García-Santesmases (2007). Laicismo, agnosticismo y fundamentalismo. Madrid: Biblioteca Nueva.
- Antonio García-Santesmases (2007). Historia, memoria y futuro. Nicolás Redondo (1927–2007). Madrid: Fundación Largo Caballero.

Editor

- José Luis L. Aranguren (2005). La izquierda, el poder y otros ensayos. Madrid: Trotta.

== Bibliography ==
- Arellano García, Juan Manuel (2017). "Los intelectuales en la Transición: Antonio García Santesmases". Revista Investigación y Letras. 1 (1). Cádiz: Universidad de Cádiz: 38–53. ISSN 2531-128X.
- Díaz, Elías (2007). "Aranguren: Ética y Política". Revista Internacional de Pensamiento Político. 3. Seville: Universidad Pablo Olavide: 165–192. ISSN 1885-589X.
- Sotelo, Ignacio (2007). "El laicismo, una cuestión polémica". Revista de Libros (131).
