= Juan Bautista Soler Martí =

Spanish entrepreneur and politician

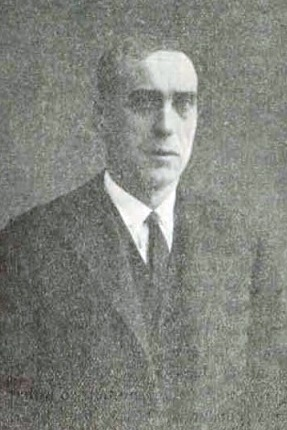
Juan Bautista Soler Martí
- Born: Juan Bautista Soler Martí; 1879; Burriana, Spain
- Died: 1936 (aged 56–57); Almassora, Spain
- Known for: entrepreneur
- Political party: Carlism

Juan Bautista Soler Martí (1879–1936) was a Spanish entrepreneur and politician. He is best known as one of key orange exporters from the Levantine coast in the interwar period; he was also one of key people behind development of the port of Burriana. He held many positions in local business and self-government, serving as mayor of Burriana in 1930–1931. Politically he headed the Carlist organization in the province of Castellón.

== Family and youth ==
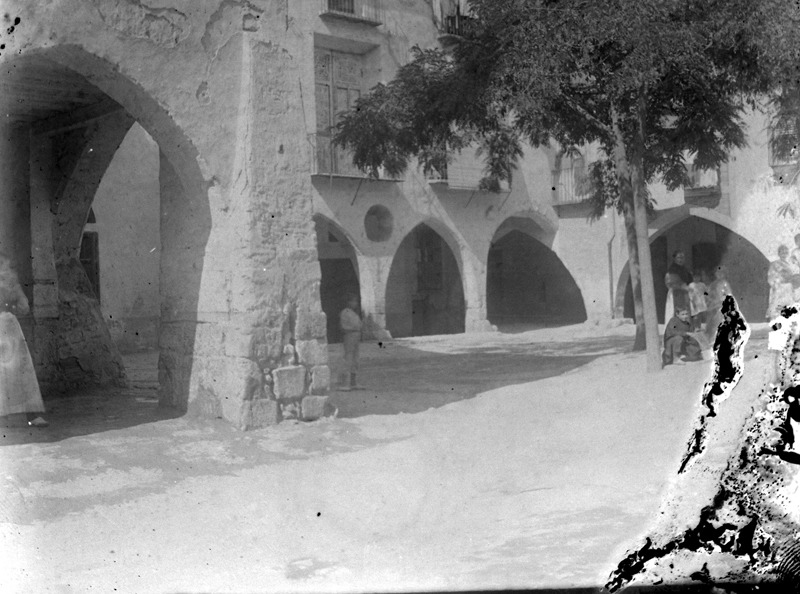
Burriana, early 20th century

The names of Soler and Martí are fairly popular on the Levantine coast and both are supposed to be of French origin, recorded already respectively in the 12th and 13th century. However, there is nothing certain about distant ancestors of Juan Bautista. His great-grandfather José Soler Mallent originated from the town of Albuixech, few miles north of Valencia; he married Ramona Torrent Rois, yet there is no information on his occupation. At some point the couple moved to the Levantine coastal town of Burriana, the birthplace of Juan Bautista's grandfather, Vicente Soler Torrent (1798–1871). He worked as petty merchant and perhaps as a farmer, busy with collecting and sale of fodder for the local livestock. Married to Ramona Torrent Rios, he had 12 children, born between 1810s and 1840s. One of them was the father of Juan Bautista, Ramón Soler Marco.

Ramón Soler Marco married Francisca Martí Perez (1844–?) and the couple remained in Burriana. They lived off the same fodder trade, though Ramón also tried to breed horses; his family is counted among the agrarian working class and because of the occupation they were known as "pallasos". They had 6 children, 3 sons and 3 daughters, Juan Bautista probably born as the youngest one. Soler Marco died prematurely as victim to a work accident, due to injuries suffered when harmed by a horse in his stable. It seems that Juan Bautista and his siblings were raised in poverty; he learnt to read and write in the army, as in 1898 he volunteered to spare conscription to his older brother Manuel, who apparently was more needed in the family economy. It is not clear whether he served on the peninsula or overseas.

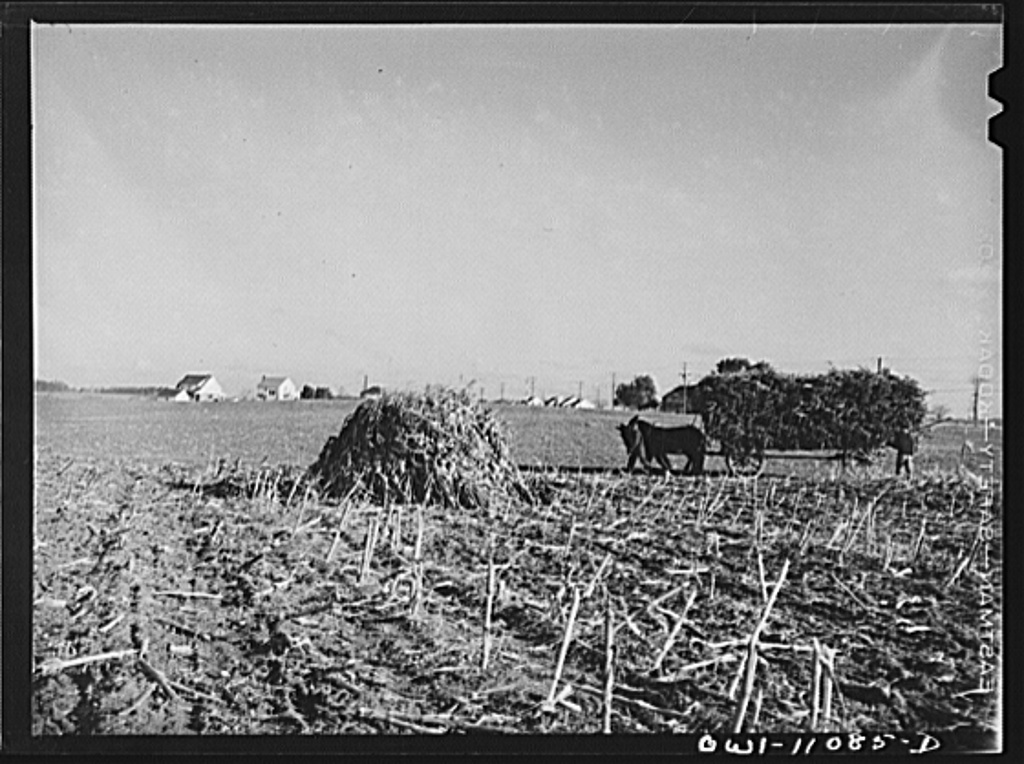
Gathering fodder

Having terminated military service in 1900 Juan Bautista commenced working in a petty merchant business of his older brother Ramón. In 1901 he married a local girl, Francisca Maria Antonia Martínez Chiva (1880–1970), daughter to another Burriana trader Blas Martínez Sales. It is not clear how many children the couple had; according to one source there were 3 boys and 2 daughters, according to another they had 4 children. Either 2 or 3 of them died prematurely; Francisca and Dolores perished in the early infant age. There is confusing information on a José, who allegedly died at the early age; he reportedly shot himself when playing with a pistol of his father, yet it is not clear whether he was indeed Soler's son. Of the two surviving sons both held important local Burriana roles. Juan Bautista Soler Martínez, a Carlist like his father, after the Civil War emerged as the provincial Falange secretary in Castellón; until death in 1970 he was concejal of the Burriana ayuntamiento. José Soler Martinez served as police operative in Almeria the early 1940s; both were engaged in orange business inherited from their father.

== Entrepreneur ==
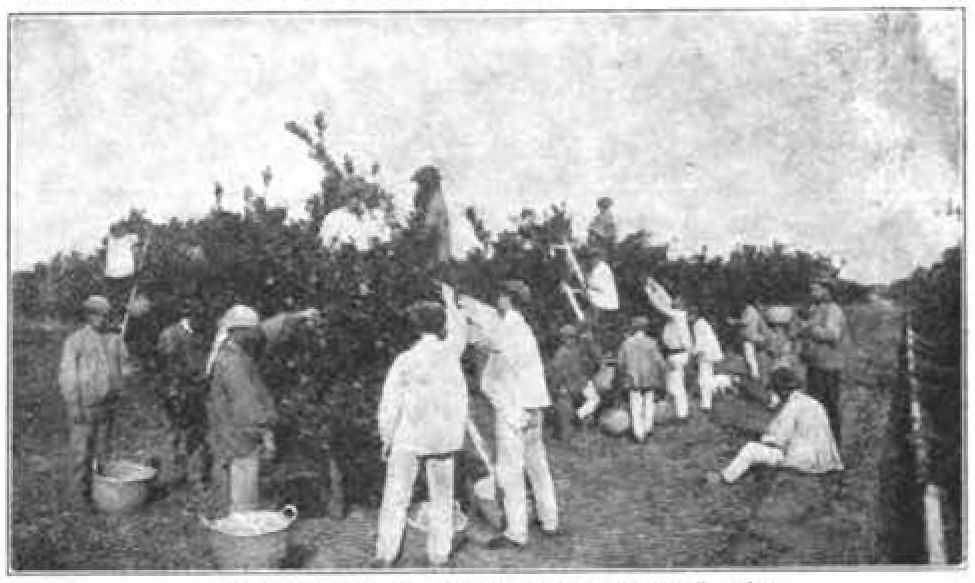
Orange harvest, Valencia region, early 20th century

In the early 1900s Soler kept working in petty merchant company run by his older brother; in a building which earlier hosted a sugar refinery "El Ingenio" and then a "Calaix" manufacture, Ramón Soler Martí set up headquarters of his orange trade business. The venture proved extremely successful commercially, mostly due to changing international market conditions. Since the very late 19th century the Levantine orange exports soared, chiefly because of growing demand in Western Europe. Burriana turned into the key export port of the region, leaving behind Gandia, Castellón and Vinaròs; in the first decade of the 20th century its exports grew by 226% in terms of tonnage and 179% in terms of value. Though coming of the Great War temporarily impaired the Levantine orange trade, exports started to grow again in the late 1910s. In 1917 Juan Bautista decided to leave the family business; banking on his 15-year-experience of "comprador de naranjas", he set up an own export company.

When Juan Bautista Soler Martí launched his venture the golden era in the Levantine orange business was just about to begin. The exports kept soaring; in the very early 1920s around 70% of Burriana oranges were shipped to Britain, but some went as far as to Gothenburg or Danzig. The local harbor infrastructure, barely more than a makeshift wooden pier, was no longer able to handle the cargo traffic. In the early 1920s Soler and other local entrepreneurs led by Jaime Chicharro were busy lobbying for financial aid; in 1921 their efforts resulted in a Royal Order which marked significant state resources for development of the harbor and envisaged also major investments which would connect the port with the national railway network.

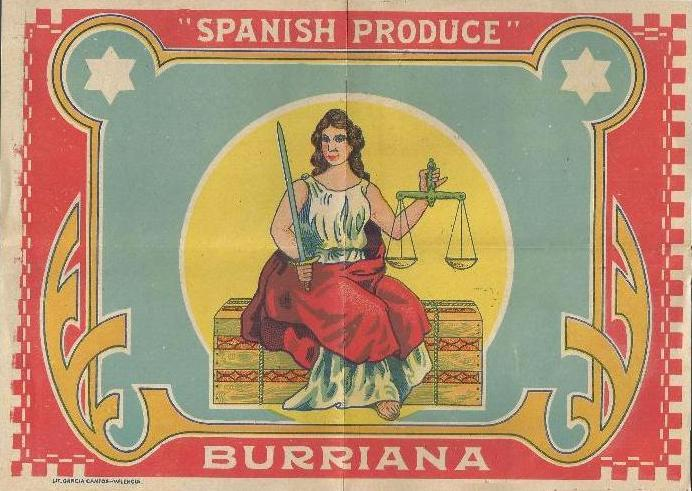
Oranges from Burriana

In the mid-1920s Soler Martí emerged as one of key local entrepreneurs. In 1924 he became president of Círculo Frutero, association of some 140 local orange exporters, and held the post during various strings also later on. Not unrelated to the orange business was his post of president of Banco de Burriana, the institution he co-founded earlier in the decade. In the 1930s he started to tune down his local Burriana engagements, e.g. in Círculo Frutero he limited himself to president of Sección de Embarques y Exportación. Instead, Soler got increasingly engaged in provincial Castellón and regional Valencian organizations; he served as director of Ponencia Naranjera de Levante and in the early 1930s entered the executive of Confederación Frutera de Levante; as its lobbyist he kept visiting ministers already during the Republican era. Soler tried also to diversify his assets; he invested in paper industry as co-owner of Papelera del Mijares, known also as Timbrado Burrianense. Soler also got engaged in show-business; he was among major shareholders of Cifesa and held stakes in Plaza de Toros and in Teatro Principal, both in Valencia. In some 25 years he turned from barely literate employee in petty family enterprise into a provincial trade tycoon running an international business and operating commercial offices in London.

== Primoderiverista ==
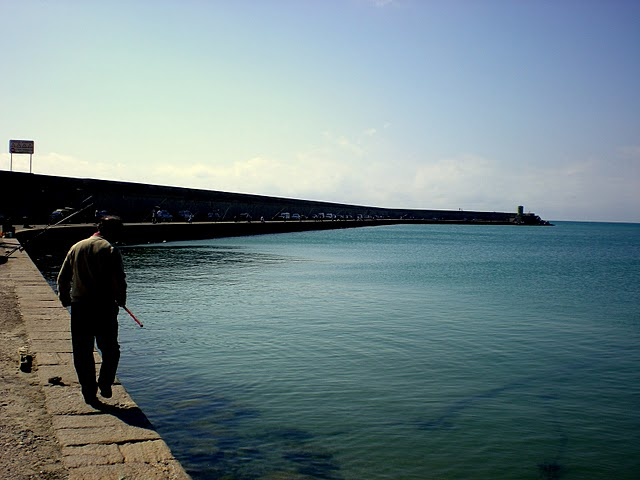
Burriana harbor, present view

None of the sources consulted provides any information on political preferences of Soler's ancestors. One clearly partisan account claims that he was a Carlist from his childhood days, yet there is no confirmation available. His biographer does not refer to any Soler's political engagements of his youth. First press notes which point to his public endeavors flavored with politics are these from the early 1920s, though they are related to lobbying for Burriana investments rather than to any party politics. In 1924 he co-fathered a large Memorandum, which outlined further infrastructure needs of the harbor. It was intended for the military Directorio; in early 1924 Soler and other local lobbyists led by Chicharro travelled to Madrid to present the document. Their mission was successful; Miguel Primo de Rivera himself demonstrated some interest and in April 1924 he visited Burriana. As a prominent local entrepreneur and co-author of Memorandum, Soler effusively welcomed the dictator. At this opportunity he was among these who co-founded the local Somatén, an auxiliary civil militia promoted by the regime, and contributed to extensive implantation of primoderiverismo in the Castellón province.

Since the early 1920s Soler was close business collaborator and personal friend to Jaime Chicharro, provincial Castellón jefé of Unión Patriótica. However, it is not clear what position he assumed during the mid-1920s internal squabbles among the Burriana primoderiveristas. Some local upetistas accused Chicharro of building local structures chiefly around his personal supporters, usually related to Traditionalism; the conflict climaxed in 1925, when Chicharro in protest resigned from the provincial presidency and moved to Madrid. The conflict did not prevent further Soler's political career; in 1927 he entered the executive of the Burriana branch of UP and in 1928 he temporarily held the post of acting president of the organization; in early 1929 he ceded the post to a newly elected candidate and himself was voted into the board. In 1928 he entered the local self-government, appointed by the regime a concejal of the Burriana ayuntamiento; his term was renewed in early 1930.

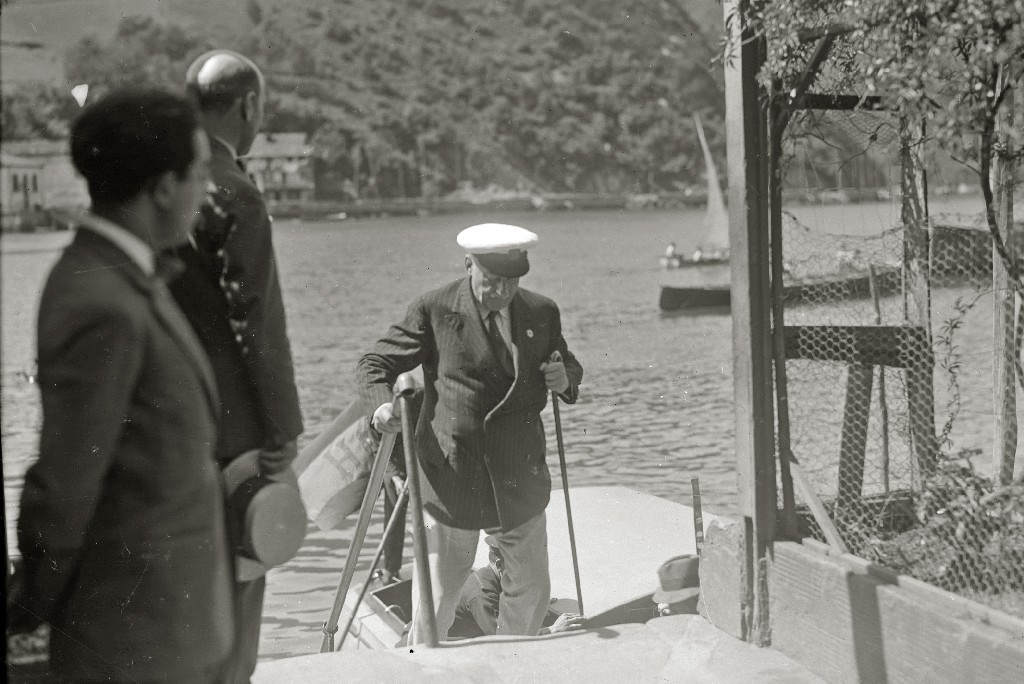
Primo de Rivera

The climax of Soler's public career fell on the dictablanda period. Following some sort of consultations with the Burriana "vox populi", which most likely stood for local business and political elites, in February 1930 the Berenguer regime appointed him the mayor of the city. In January 1931 members of the city council confirmed his post during an internal voting, but there is little known about his tenure, except that liberal press lambasted his appointment as demonstration of reactionary caciquismo. However, during final days of the monarchy Soler seemed rather politically bewildered; he entered the Castellón provincial board of a republican party but in the April 1931 local elections to the town hall he ran as a Conservative. His bid proved successful, yet in the new ayuntamiento he failed to gain enough support and his mayorship came to an end. Upon the advent of the Republic Soler's served as concejal, but it is not clear when his term finished.

== Carlist ==
Carlist standard

Though some sources refer to him as "Traditionalist mayor" there is no evidence of Soler's links to the Carlists in 1930–1931. However, it appears that from the early 1930s he was already engaged in the newly united Carlist political organization, Comunión Tradicionalista; most likely he was introduced by one of the pre-1919 Jaimista leaders in Castellón, Chicharro. In 1933 Soler co-sponsored Carlist propaganda publications by placing adverts of his fruit export business. However, neither press of the era nor present-day historians note him as engaged in Carlist activities; he was not noted as speaking at public rallies, negotiating electoral deals or forging political line in central Carlist executive bodies. It is not exactly clear what mechanism produced his 1933 nomination to head of the provincial Carlist organization in Castellón; it was probably the result of his wealth, prestige and personal friendship with Chicharro.

As a provincial Carlist jefé Soler was not particularly active; his best known public appearance was this at a funeral of Chicharro in 1934. In the mid-1930s he rather engaged in the increasingly bitter social conflict; international crisis produced decline in orange exports, which in turn resulted in reduced demand for labor and lower pay. The year of 1933 saw strikes of orange workers, which continued in 1934 and 1935; in 1936 UGT and CNT workers formed Consejo Levantino Unificado de Exportación de Agrios, which sought to exercise control not only on working conditions but also on exports. Some started to occupy plots as first step towards collectivization; Soler gained their hostility which would soon seal his fate. In the 1936 general elections he ran in Castellón on the Candidatura Católico-Tradicionalista ticket, part of the general Levantine Derecha Regional Agraria alliance. He made it into history of electoral campaigning in Spain as the first one to use aircraft for propaganda purposes, but with 11,800 votes gained he failed to earn the Cortes mandate.

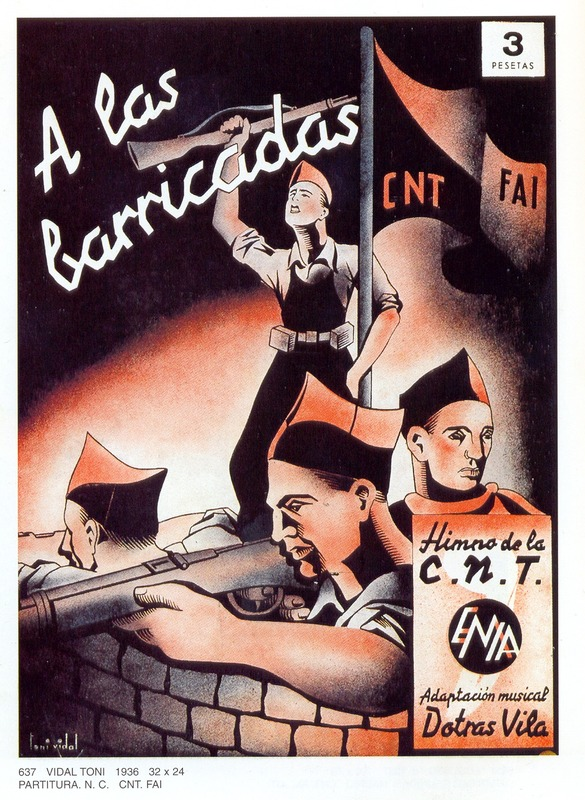
Anarchist poster

It is not clear whether Soler Martí engaged in Carlist conspiracy against the Republic or whether he was aware of it. However, as the provincial party leader he must have been informed about the Carlist paramilitary buildup in Castellón; there were some 2,500 volunteers enlisted to Requeté in the province, 400 of them in Burriana alone. In mid-July 1936 he was with his family and friends, the Derecha Regional Valenciana leader Luis Lucia among them, on holiday in Benassal. When it became clear that in Levante the rebels had failed Soler did not feel much threatened; on the advice of Lucia he decided to stay in Benassal. However, having learnt that Burriana workers, grouped in Centro Obrero de Burriana, launched search for him, he eventually decided to seek shelter in the nearby town Vilafranca. The locals tipped the Burriana search squad and Soler was soon detained. He was placed in the Castellón prison, yet his stay behind bars lasted no longer than 2 months. In mid-September he was extracted from jail and executed by the Anarchist Iron Column at the Almassora cemetery.

== See also ==
- Traditionalism (Spain)
- Carlism
- Jaime Chicharro Sánchez-Guió
