= Burriana, Castellón =

Burriana Borriana
- Town and municipality
- Borriana / Burriana (official)
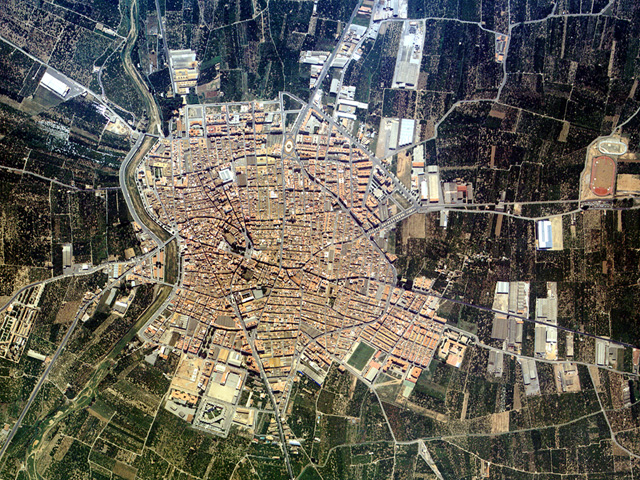

- Flag Coat of arms

- Location in Spain Burriana (Valencian Community) Burriana (Spain)
- Coordinates: 39°53′22″N 0°05′33″W
- Country: Spain
- Autonomous community: Valencian Community
- Province: Castellón
- Comarca: Plana Baixa
- Judicial district: Castelló de la Plana

Government
  - Alcalde: Maria Josep Safont Melchor (PSPV-PSOE)

Area
  - Total: 47.2 km^{2} (18.2 sq mi)
- Elevation: 13 m (43 ft)

Population (2025-01-01)
  - Total: 37,915
  - Density: 803/km^{2} (2,080/sq mi)
- Demonyms: Burrianan or Borrianan • borrianenc, -a (Val.) • burrianero/a, also burrianense (Sp.)
- Official language(s): Valencian; Spanish
- Linguistic area: Valencian
- Time zone: UTC+1 (CET)
  - Summer (DST): UTC+2 (CEST)
- Postal code: 12530
- Website: www.burriana.es

Burriana, (Note: Pronunciation of Burriana: Spanish: [buˈrjana]) in Spanish, or Borriana, (Note: Pronunciation of Borriana: Valencian: [boriˈana], also [buriˈana]) in Valencian (officially Borriana / Burriana), is a town and municipality in eastern Spain, in the province of Castellón, part of the Valencian Community. Its population exceeds 35,000.

The town is located by the Mediterranean Sea, at the lowest region of the Plana Baixa, surrounded by orange tree fields watered by the Millars River.

It has about 15 km of coastline, including Burriana's principal beach "El Arenal", an attractive spot, especially during the summer. "El Arenal" has about 2 km of seashore, has been awarded the blue flag, which recognizes its sand and water thanks to the treatments carried out by the city council.

The seaside is 1.5 km from the center of the town. During the summer, the seaside population can triple due to vacationers and from locals from the center of the town moving into the seaside. The town is reachable from Castelló de la Plana through the CV-18 or the N-340 routes.

In literature, Burriana is briefly described by James A. Michener in the book, Iberia. As a young man, Michener landed there as a part of a ship crew. The merchant vessel was there to collect oranges for the Scottish marmalade industry. Oranges, after being loaded into metal barrels, were dragged out to sea by bulls.

The town displays many memorial spots dedicated to James A. Michener, such as a street and a sign that quotes one of his passages, where he expresses his first sight of Borriana as he approached land from the sea.

The town was once home to a Jewish community, which settled in Burriana after the Christian reconquest of the area in 1233. In 1486, the community faced a crisis when local magistrates attempted to seize the silver ornaments of their synagogue's Torah scrolls. Just a few years later, during the expulsion of the Jews in 1492, Jews left to the nearby port of Valencia.

== Villages ==
- Burriana town proper
- Les Alqueries de Santa Bàrbara
- El Port de Borriana (Burriana harbor)
- El Grau de Borriana
- La Serratella
- Les Alqueries del Ferrer
- Poblats marítims
- Virrangues (uninhabited)

== Main sights ==
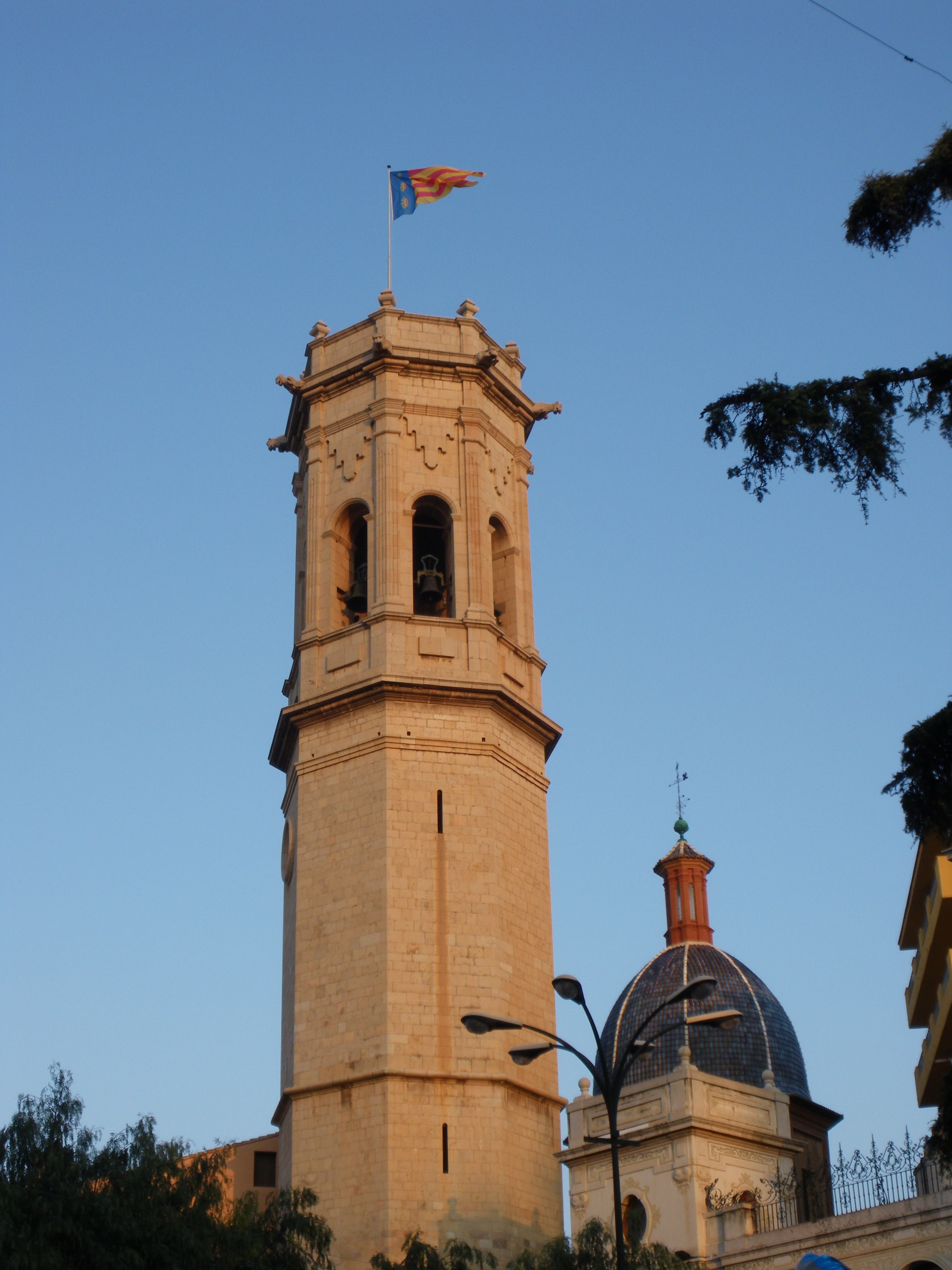
Campanar de Burriana

- Church of El Salvador (13th century), with an apse in early Gothic style, and Romanesque elements as well. The bell tower is from the 15th century.
- Sea Tower (16th century)
- Modernist House
- Underwater Archaeology Center
- Clot de la Mare de Déu natural park
- Orange Museum
- Municipal Archaeology Museum

== Notable people ==
- Juan Bautista Soler Martí (1879–1936); businessman, alcalde of Burriana (1930–1931), co-responsible for rapid upgrade of the port infrastructure
- Jaime Chicharro Sánchez-Guió (1889–1934); politician and entrepreneur, heavily contributed to development of the Burriana harbor
- Juan Granell Pascual (1902–1962); politician and official, during early Francoism promoted and secured new investments in railways, roads, streets, port, education, sewage and other municipal infrastructure
- Enric Monsonís Domingo (1931–2011); liberal politician, served as the head of the Pre-autonomous Council of the Valencian Country from 1979 to 1982.
- Vicente Enrique y Tarancón (1907–1994); Cardinal of the Roman Catholic Church, served as Archbishop of Madrid from 1971 to 1983.
- Mercedes Sanchordi (1969–2018); town councillor and member of the Corts Valencianes

== Twin towns ==
- Vila-real, Spain

== See also ==
- List of municipalities in Castellón
