= Mercedes Sanchordi =

Spanish politician

Mercedes Sanchordi García (5 November 1969 – 18 October 2018) was a Spanish Socialist Workers' Party (PSOE) politician. She served in the Corts Valencianes from 1999 to 2011.

== Biography ==
Born in Castellón de la Plana and a lawyer by profession, Sanchordi was elected to the town council in Burriana in 1995, for the Socialist Party of the Valencian Country (PSPV). She was then elected to the Corts Valencianes in 1999, representing the Castellón constituency; she was re-elected in 2003 and 2007. She remained in her municipal and regional offices until 2011. She was the secretary of the Commission on the Control of Radiotelevisió Valenciana and of Public Works and Transport.

In 2008, Sanchordi was the first deputy anywhere in Spain to vote on a bill from home, shortly after the birth of her only son. For International Women's Day in 2022, Valencian newspaper Las Provincias remarked that this was a groundbreaking event in women's participation in politics. In 2015, after the PSPV were voted out from power, party leader Ximo Puig recruited her as an advisor. She left the role in 2018, in the latter stages of her final illness.
