= Our Lady of Remembrance College, Madrid =

Coordinates: 40°28′6.44″N 3°40′44.3″W

Our Lady of Remembrance College, Madrid Nuestra Señora del Recuerdo

Location
- Plaza Duque de Pastrana, Madrid; Spain

Information
- Religious affiliation(s): Roman Catholic Jesuit
- Established: 1880; 145 years ago
- Headmaster: m
- Staff: m
- Faculty: 160 teachers
- Gender: Coeducational
- Enrollment: 2,400
- Campus: 25 acres
- Website: RecuerdoMadrid

Our Lady of Remembrance College, Madrid, (El Recuerdo or Colegio de Chamartin) is an infant through baccalaureate school established by the Society of Jesus in 1880, located in the Chamartín District of Madrid. According to studies by El Mundo in 2007 and 2012, it is one of the best schools in Spain.

== History ==
El Recuerdo was founded in 1880 when Alfonso XII restored the Society of Jesus in Spain, after their expulsion by Charles III.

The Dukes of Pastrana-Infantado donated their land in Chamartin de la Rosa for the foundation of the school, and classes began in early 1880. The original school building was in neo-Gothic style and designed by the Marquis of Cubas in the late nineteenth century. In 1920, a new, Gothic-Moorish style building was designed by Modesto Lopez Otero, who modelled it after the house of Ignatius of Loyola in Azpeitia.

The school building was closed under the Government of the Second Republic that again expelled the Jesuits, but classes were held clandestinely. During the Republic, the school became an institute and during the Civil War it was used as a barracks.

In the postwar period the El Recuerdo facility housed the Jesuit philosophate, until 1955 when this was moved to Alcalá de Henares. Also during the postwar period included on campus was the free school of Nª Sª del Recuerdo, which had its entrance on Mateo Inurria Street and served mostly neighborhood children studying for the board exams taken at the Cardinal Cisneros Institute on Kings Street.

== Notable alumni ==
Art and sport

- Bertin Osborne, singer
- Damaso Alonso, writer
- Francisco Rabal, actor
- Gabino Diego, actor
- Luis Aragones, footballer
- Ramon Moreno Grosso, footballer
- Javier Beirán, basketball player

Intellectuals

- Adolfo Nicolas, Superior General of the Society of Jesus 2008-2016, (College of Areneros)
- Angel Gabilondo, Minister of Education and rector;
- Jaime Chicharro Sánchez-Guió, lawyer

Politics

- Francisco de Cubas, the Marquis de Cubas, architect and politician
- Alberto Ruiz-Gallardón, Minister of Justice of the Government of Spain and Notary Mayor of the Kingdom, Mayor of Madrid, president of the Community of Madrid (also belonged to the Choir School of Remembrance)
- Alberto Martin-Artajo, politician and former minister
- José María Álvarez del Manzano, mayor of Madrid
- Miguel Arias Canete, People's Party MEP, former Minister of Agriculture, Food, and Environment
- Rodrigo Rato, businessman, director of the IMF, minister and VP of the Government of Spain, later - convicted fraudster;
- Enrique de la Mata Gorostizaga, Minister of Trade Relations (College of Areneros)
- Íñigo Cavero, Minister of Justice (College of Areneros)

Economy

- Enrique Fuentes Quintana, Professor of Political Economy and Vice President of the Government of Spain (College of Areneros)
- Pablo Isla, Inditex president;

== See also ==
- List of Jesuit sites
