= Jaime Chicharro Sánchez-Guió =

Spanish Conservative and Carlist politician

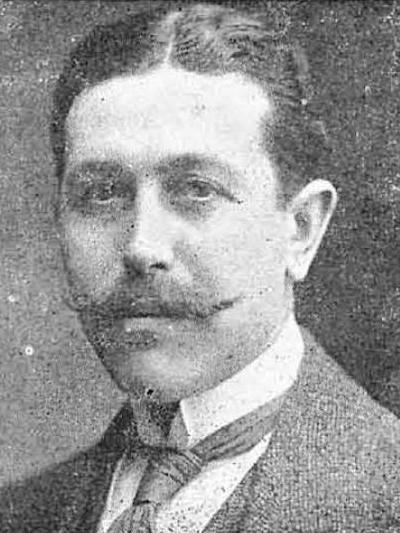
- Born: Jaime Chicharro Sánchez-Guió; 1889; Torralba de Calatrava, Spain
- Died: 1934 (aged 44–45); Guadarrama, Spain
- Occupations: lawyer, landowner
- Known for: Politician
- Political party: Comunión Católico-Monárquica; Conservative Party; Partido Católico Nacional; Union Patriotica; Comunión Tradicionalista
- Spouse: Dolores Lamamié de Clairac Romero y Bermúdez de Castro (1890-1974)
- Children: 13

Jaime Chicharro Sánchez-Guió (1889–1934) was a Spanish Conservative and Carlist politician. He is known mostly as the moving spirit behind turning a fishing bay in Burriana into a modern port, facilitating export of oranges grown in the area. As a politician he is recognized as representative of large proprietors within the Carlist movement.

== Family and youth ==
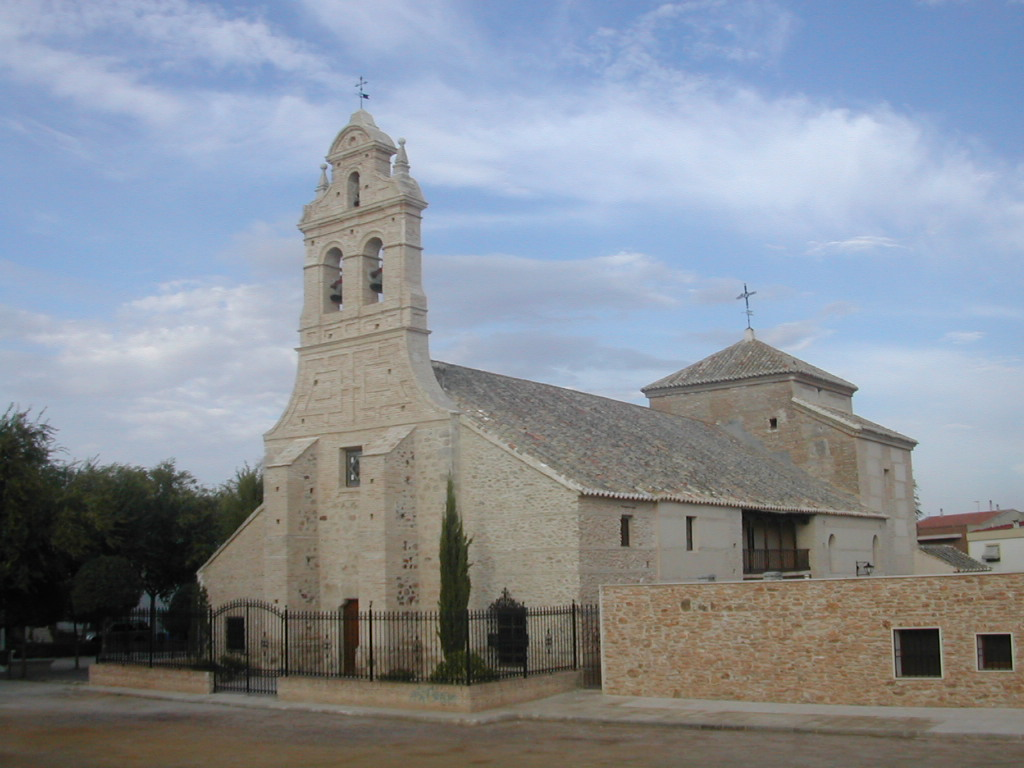
Torralba de Calatrava

Jaime Chicharro Sánchez-Guió was born to a family of Castilian landowners. His paternal ancestors originated from Vascongadas; his grandfather, Jesús Chicharro de la Torre, was a military engineer and settled in the province of Ciudad Real following railway construction works. Jaime's father, José Chicharro Martín del Moral (1856-1905), sided with the legitimists during the Third Carlist War. He married Soledad Sánchez-Guió Ruiz-Hidalgo (1860-1912). The couple had 4 children, apart from Jaime also three daughters, all raised in a fervently Catholic ambience.

In 1897 the young Jaime entered the Jesuit Colegio Nuestra Señora del Recuerdo in the Madrid district of Chamartín de la Rosa. Having completed secondary education he moved to Biscay commencing law studies in the Jesuit Deusto College. Following graduation he completed his education obtaining diploma in Philosophy and Letters from the Universidad Central (later Universidad Complutense) in Madrid. Holding two diplomas he settled in Madrid and assumed the chair of History in same Jesuit college he had attended earlier.

In 1912 Chicharro married Dolores Lamamié de Clairac Romero y Bermúdez de Castro (1890-1974), related to the Salamanca landowner and later a well-known Carlist politician, José María Lamamié de Clairac y de la Colina. As she inherited some 300 hectares around Villarreal and Nules, the family moved to the spouse's La Salmantina estate, now located in the municipality of Les Alqueries (Castellón province). The couple had 13 children, born between 1914 and 1932. During early months of the Civil War the oldest daughter was tortured and killed by the Republican militia in Madrid. Five sons volunteered to the Carlist Requeté; one of them died in 1939 due to tortures suffered as the Republican POW. Four sons joined División Azul; two of them died in combat in Russia, the two who survived grew to Francoist generals. His second youngest son served as a diplomat and subgobernador in the Spanish Equatorial Guinea. The youngest son became sort of celebrity as a wrestling champion in the 1950s. Some of Jaime's grandchildren became public figures and stirred political controversy as late as in 2013.

== Young Carlistwlink ==
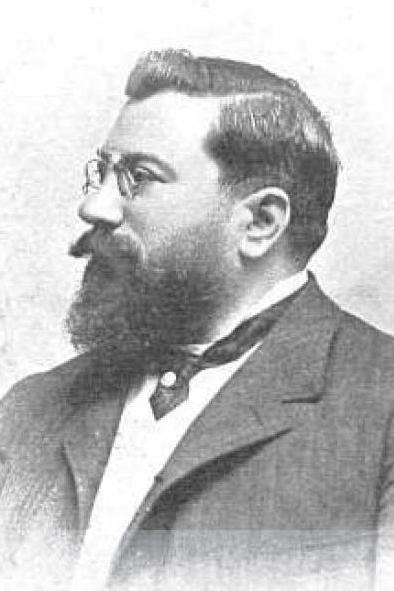
Juan Vazquez de Mella

Chicharro inherited his militant ultraconservative outlook after his father, who following the Carlist war service contributed belligerent pieces to the Carlist Ciudad Real based El Manchego weekly in the 1880s. The leaning was further reinforced when during his Madrid academic years Chicharro met and got fascinated by Juan Vázquez de Mella, the top Carlist theorist. In 1909 he co-founded the local Centro Tradicionalista and together with other young Carlists he set up El Combate, a review later renamed to Juventud Tradicionalista. Active in Catholic organizations, he started to appear on public meetings, like those confronting the idea of secular education. In 1911 he engaged in launching Congreso Eucaristico and later joined Junta Nacional de Propagandistas de Acción Católica. Also in 1911 Chicharro joined the Madrid Junta Católica, part of a national electoral effort engineered by the Church and intended to produce a grand Catholic political alliance. At that time he was already a Carlist activist recognized nationally.

When following his marriage Chicharro moved to Castellón province he remained in the same political ambience, becoming president of the local Juventud Jaimista and in 1915 growing to jefe of the Villareal Jaimistas. In 1916 he entered the Castellón Junta Provincial and became its vice-president, going on with his Villarreal jefatura duties. The same year for the first time he launched his bid for the Cortes standing in the Nules district. At that time Valencian Carlism was divided between the mainstream purs and the dissident paquistes, followers of Francisco Giner Lila; Chicharro seemed to have allied with none and unsuccessfully ran a broad conservative ticket, forming part of the contenders loyal to the Murcian party leader, Juan de la Cierva y Peñafiel.

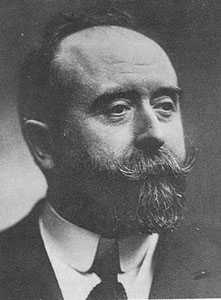
Juan de la Cierva

He tried his luck again in Nules in the subsequent campaign of 1918, though political configuration of the time seems particularly obscure and illegible. According to some, he represented the purs faction and was supported by a partially controlled newspaper, La Gaceta de Levante, opposed by the competing paquistes fraction and the conservative mauristas. According to another scholar, Chicharro was criticized by orthodox Carlists for his strong predilection for broad Right-wing alliances, blurring the Traditionalist political identity. He lost again, failing to get the ticket also in by-elections staged later that year as the victorious candidate died soon after having been elected.

== Mellista ==
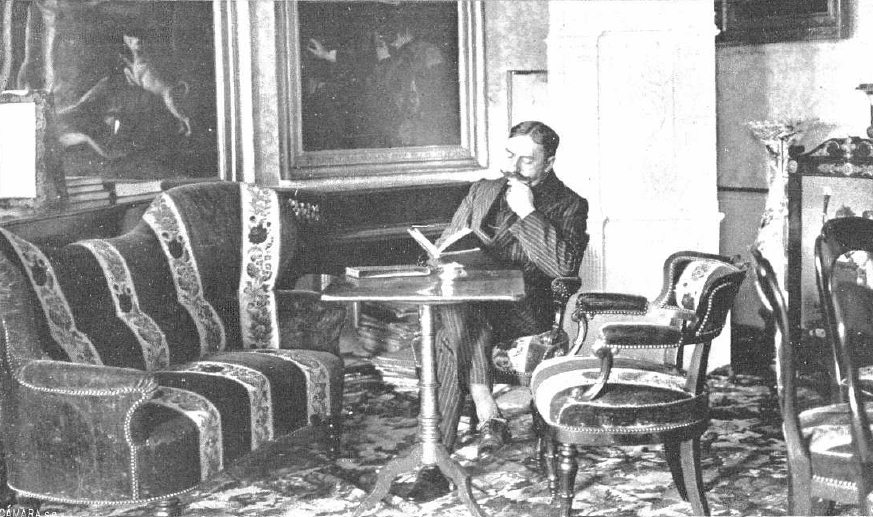
S. M. Jaime III, 1912

In the 1910s Carlism was increasingly divided between its top theorist Juan Vazquez de Mella and the claimant, Jaime III; the former tended to downplay dynastical issues for the sake of advancing a grand Right-wing formation, united by Traditionalist values. Chicharro sympathised with his former Madrid master and emerged as one of the most vehement Mella supporters; when in 1919 the crisis exploded and the Carlists were forced to take sides, he left the claimant and joined the rebels. In the 1919 electoral campaign he already represented a broad and somewhat vague conservative platform, advocating a broad Catholic national party of the Right. Some sources claim he counted among governmental maurista candidates, some present him as a catholic-monarchist, a ciervista or a Carlist. Finally successful, when in the Cortes he sided with the ciervistas. In 1920 re-election campaign Chicharro had the loyal Carlists pitted against him, but he managed to renew his ticket and served in the diet until 1923.

In the parliament, at that time dominated by the Conservatives of Eduardo Dato, Chicharro remained a rather restless and turbulent deputy, occasionally sliding to opposition. Apart from the customary anti-liberal diatribes, he was particularly vocal on financial issues, entering into taxation and budgetary disputes with the Minister of Economy. His most lasting achievement is a Royal Order, which marked significant state resources for development of the local Burriana harbor. The design, apart from massive upgrade of the facilities, envisaged also major investments which connected the port with the national railroad network. The work was carried out until the early 1930s and transformed what used to be chiefly a simple fishing bay into a small but modern commercial transport hub. Key beneficiaries of the project were the local Levantine landowners, who gained a gateway for the export of their orange production; Chicharro kept lobbying for their cause in Madrid also during the decades to come. In recognition of his merits, the city of Burriana named Chicharro its hijo adoptivo; upon his return from Madrid he was greeted with arches of triumph and venerating celebrations.

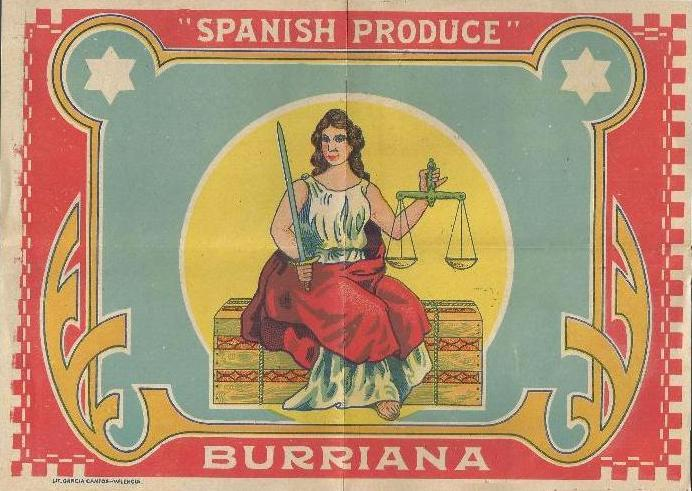
oranges from Burriana

Though initially one of the most outspoken de Mella supporters, Chicharro did not integrate fully in the Mellista group; some speak even of "chicharrismo", others dubbed him "mauro-ciervista". While de Mella was firm on his Traditionalist principles and opted for a grand conservative party built upon them, Chicharro started to lean towards the vision of Victor Pradera, embracing a more loose Right-wing alliance held together by a lowest common denominator. In the early 1920s he effectively left the Mellistas; some scholars consider him paradigmatic for many rebellious Carlists who joined de Mella in 1919, but soon abandoned him to pursue their own goals and to amalgamate in other Right-wing groupings.

== Catholic conservative ==
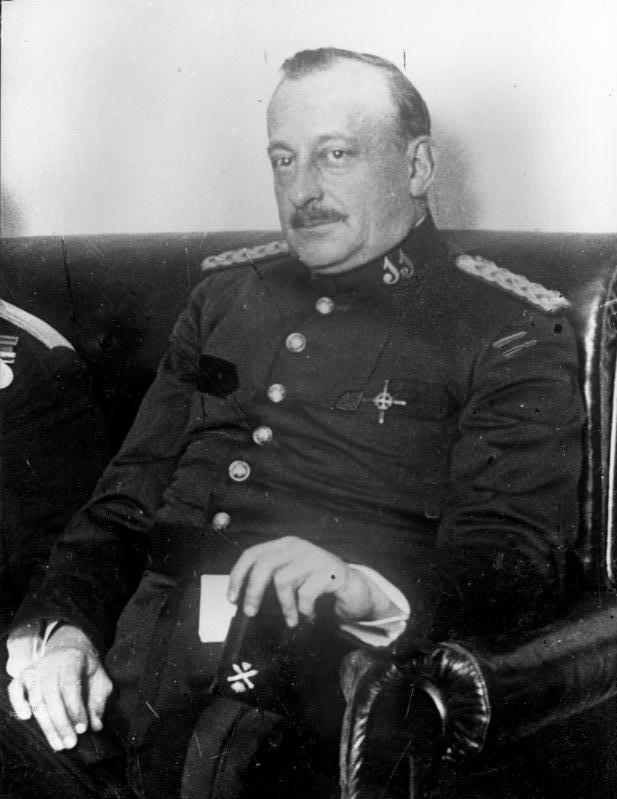
Primo de Rivera

During electoral campaign of 1923 Chicharro was considered a favourite. It is not clear to what extent he ruined his chances himself: during one of electoral meetings in the very city of Burriana he was challenged by a local workers' leader. Chicharro resolved to a stick and engaged in a brawl, resulting in his victim treated in hospital for head wounds and an administrative action taken against the assailant. Diario de Castellón, the newspaper he founded and owned, failed to mobilize enough support and produced merely significant financial losses. Eventually Chicharro and an albista counter-candidate recorded almost the same score; the latter was declared victorious following behind-the-scene dealings.

In 1924 Chicharro was active setting up the local Castellon branch of Union Patriotica and soon became its provincial jefe. In the new partido unico he championed the Catholic-based branch and got increasingly alienated by what he perceived as marginalization of the Catholic groupings; other local upetistas accused him of building the local structures chiefly around his former Traditionalist supporters. The conflict climaxed in 1925, when Chicharro in protest resigned from the provincial presidency.

In 1925 the Chicharros left Levante and moved to Madrid; it is not clear whether the change was anyhow related to political tension or was rather due to financial issues, as reported by some sources; In the capital he started to practice as a lawyer and apparently became fairly successful, as in the early 1930s he grew to member of Junta de Gobierno of the Madrid Congregacion de los Abogados.

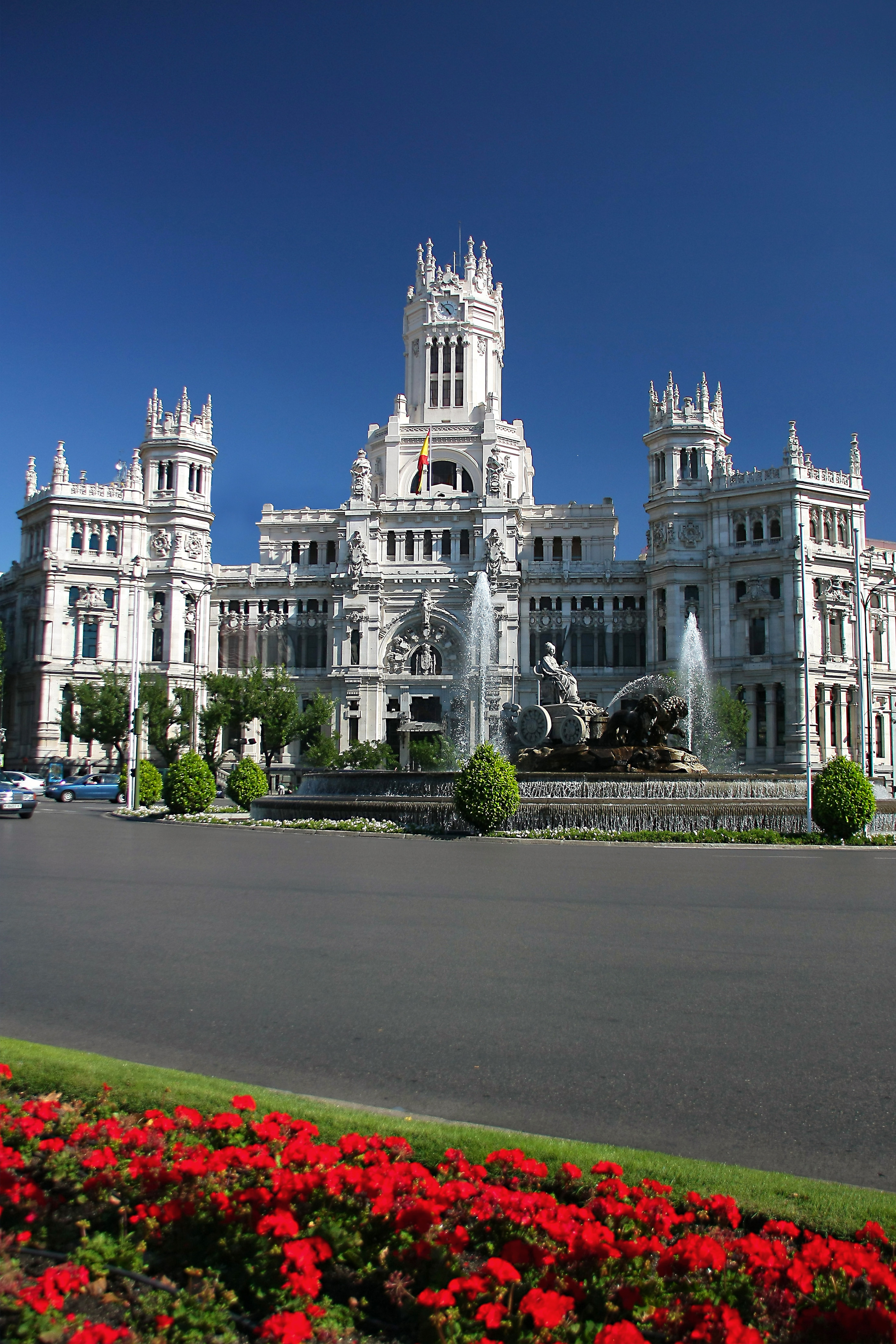
ayuntamiento of Madrid

In 1927 Chicharro commenced his career as municipal official, appointed one of 64 new councilors of the Madrid ayuntamiento. In 1928 he grew to teniente de alcalde responsible for the Chamberí district; appointed member of Junta municipal de Primera enseñanza he specialized in education issues, dealing also with culture and science. Chicharro resumed contacts with Vázquez de Mella; only weeks after his death, in March 1928, he arranged for a commemorative plaque to be mounted on the Escuela Normal de Maestros wall and looked after his library. In 1930 the press already referred to him as former teniente de alcalde, but it is not clear when he ceased.

During the last years of the monarchy Chicharro seemed politically disoriented. Though in the press plebiscite he was voted one of three best possible representatives of Castellon province in Asamblea Nacional, he was not appointed its member. He remained active in Catholic groupings like Acción social, giving lectures and contributing as organizer and manager. As friend of Lamamié he maintained links with his Acción Castellana, set up in 1930, and was drawn closer to another of his organizations, Federación Católico-Agraria Salmantina. He remained in the circle of Francesc Cambó, leader of the Catalan conservative Lliga Regionalista. Last but not least, he retained his Carlist contacts with the former mellistas, now headed by the new leader, Victor Pradera.

== Reconciled Carlist ==
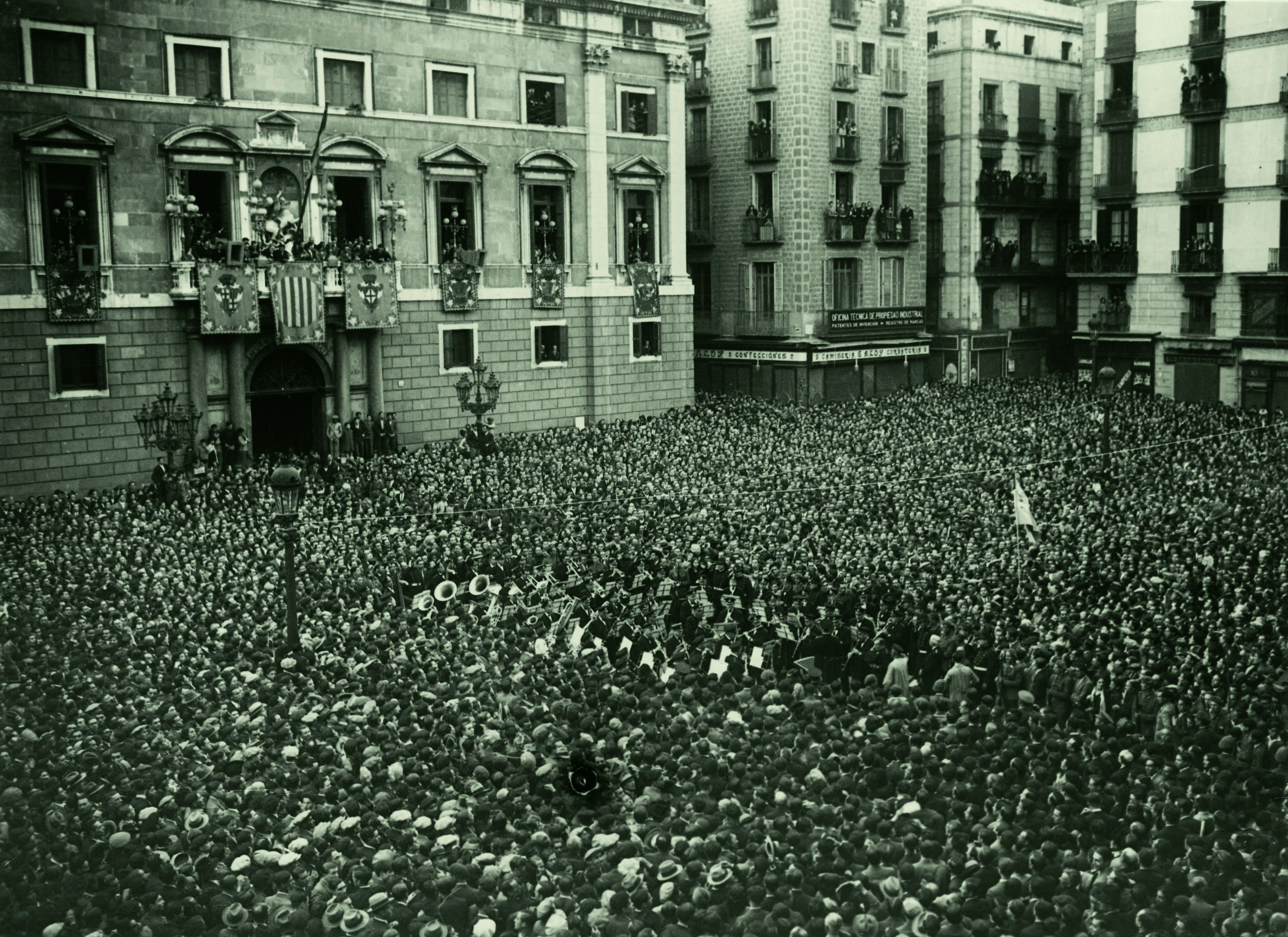
Republic declared

During the local elections of April 1931 Chicharro was overwhelmed by the republican tide and as an independent conservative candidate he failed to get voted into the Madrid ayuntamiento. After proclamation of the Republic he decided to take part in the June 1931 elections to the Cortes from Castellón, still supported by Diario de Castellón, officially the voice of Federación Castellonense de Sindicatos Agrícolas. Chicharro was invited to join the Republicans; according to one source he boldly refused, but according to the press he was running as "derecha republicana". The result was rather poor – some call it humiliating - since he arrived 11th with some 11 thousand votes out of 96,000 cast in the province.

In late 1931 Chicharro started to attend Traditionalist meetings, gradually re-joining followers of the Carlist king and entering their new organization, Comunión Tradicionalista. Though not counting among national leaders, in the press he emerged as one of the most-quoted Carlist speakers of the first half of 1932, extremely active touring the country and delivering public addresses. In January 1932 he already gave lecture about collaboration and Carlism; in February he presented a broad foreign policy program including control of Gibraltar, federation with Portugal and confederation with Latin American states, in March he labeled the proposed universal suffrage as unjust and lambasted the Republican government for overspending and highly inflated budget. The same month he triggered riots in Soria by proclaiming that he had no intention of surrendering an iota of his wealth without a fight. In April he got his car stolen from the Madrid street. A number of meetings with him taking part were suspended when already ongoing for fear of unrest. Late 1932 he started to write first-page newspaper pieces himself.

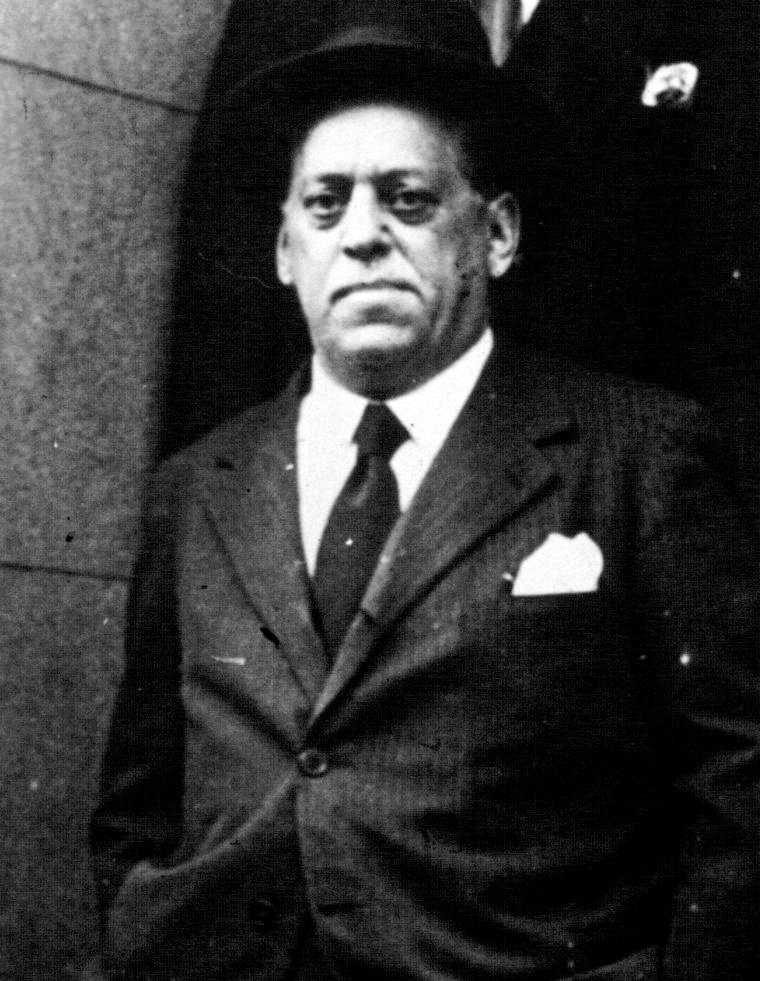
José Sanjurjo

In 1932 Chicharro got engaged in conspiracy of José Sanjurjo, though no details are known. Following the disastrously failed coup he was identified as one of the culprits and became subject of the expropriation, designed to boost the floundering Agrarian Reform. Later that year two of his sons were detained and administrated exile in the Spanish Sahara outpost of Villa Cisneros, which would soon turn into the Carlist hotbed. Continuing with his tours across the country later in 1933 he defended some of the Sanjuriada conspirators in court, though he was himself closely watched by the security and in May he faced trial for inflammatory speak.

== Last months ==
Carlist standard

In 1933 Chicharro was active mixing with the Alfonsist monarchists in the Tradicionalistas y Renovación Española alliance; by the local Castellon Liaison Committee he was agreed to represent it in the forthcoming elections. This gained him hostility among new radical Carlist activists like Jaime del Burgo, who despised fraternization with caciques and debris of the Alfonsine monarchy. Moreover, for the Carlist youth the landowners like Lamamié and Chicharro became marked men as privileged section of politically dominant potentates, who are "obstructing the Agrarian Reform by the feudal egoism of the odious grandees of grain". Though indeed within Carlism Chicharro formed the most reactionary faction, conservatism did not render him averse to new radical social movements. Discussing Benito Mussolini and Adolf Hitler he declared that Traditionalism, "though not one and the same thing, is very sympathetic towards them, as they are waging war against Judaism, freemasonry and Marxism, building an organized corporative state. What is inacceptable to us is the state's overwhelming sovereignty and dominance. For us the family comes first, followed by municipality, region and state, which is the last element in this chain".

Riding the wave of soaring rightist sympathies, in 1933 Chicharro was elected to the Madrid ayuntamiento from the Chamberí district. However, running on the Carlist ticket to the Cortes from Castellón he narrowly lost, though initially he was reported by the press as victorious and his fellow Traditionalist Juan Granell Pascual was indeed elected. At that time he was already seriously ill. Having been generally of rather poor health, as a chain-smoker Chicharro developed grave respiratory problems. Though as late as 1932 he was still hailed by the press as "ilustrado joven", in August 1933 he was placed in the tuberculosis-treatment Real Sanatorio de Guadarrama, where he died early 1934. His funeral and related commemorative homage feasts staged across Spain helped to mobilize support and demonstrated growing dynamics of Carlism. As the widow and 13 half-orphaned children were in financial dire straits, Comunión Tradicionalista launched a public fund-raising campaign intended to assist them.

== See also ==
- Carlism
- Mellismo
- José María Lamamié de Clairac
- Juan Vázquez de Mella
- Restoration (Spain)
- Miguel Primo de Rivera
- Second Spanish Republic
- Puerto de Burriana
