= Les Alqueries =

Les Alqueries Las Alquerías del Niño Perdido
- Municipality
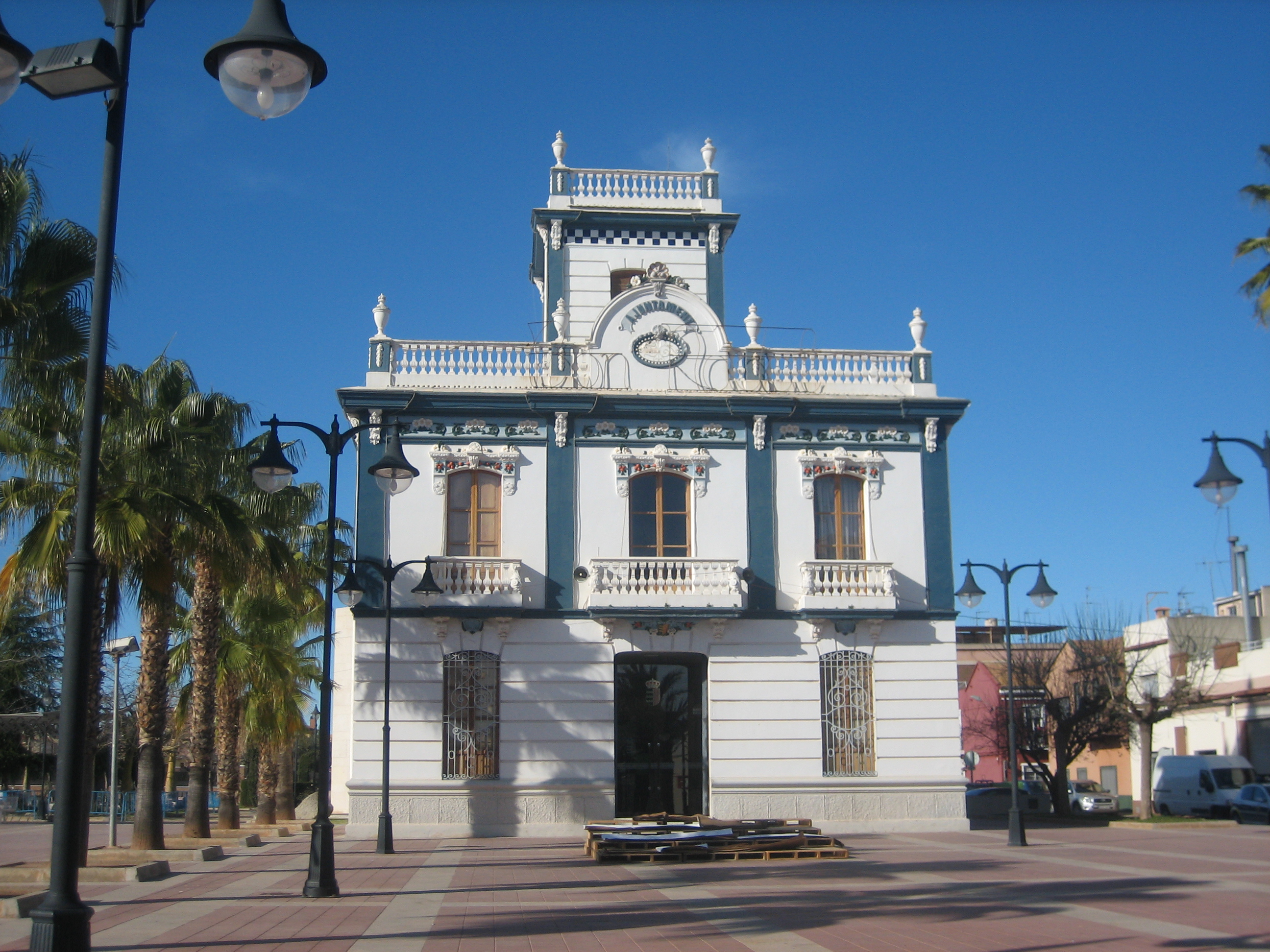
- Town Hall.

- Flag Coat of arms

- Location in Spain
- Coordinates: 39°53′47″N 0°06′49″E
- Country: Spain
- Autonomous community: Valencian Community
- Province: Castelló
- Comarca: Plana Baixa
- Judicial district: Vila-Real

Government
  - Mayor: Consuelo Sanz Molés

Area
  - Total: 12.6 km^{2} (4.9 sq mi)
- Elevation: 40 m (130 ft)

Population (2025-01-01)
  - Total: 4,605
  - Density: 365/km^{2} (947/sq mi)
- Demonym: Alqueriers
- Time zone: UTC+1 (CET)
  - Summer (DST): UTC+2 (CEST)
- Postal code: 12530
- Official language(s): Valencian and Spanish
- Website: Official website

Les Alqueries (Valencian: [lez alkeˈɾi.es]; Spanish: Las Alquerías del Niño Perdido [las alkeˈɾi.as ðel ˈniɲo peɾˈðiðo]) is a town in eastern Spain, in the province of Castellón, part of the Valencian autonomous community.

Economy is based on agriculture, specializing in growing oranges. It became an independent commune from Vila-real in 1985.

== History ==
The area where Les Alqueries is located (60 kilometers to the north of Valencia) has been populated since the Iberian era. Les Alqueries was formerly divided into three smaller villages called Bellaguarda, Bonastre and Bonretorn. Prior to 1609 most inhabitants of those villages were ethnically Andalusī Muslims. A new Christian population slowly occupied the properties left by Muslims (Moriscos) after April 1609 (date of the expulsion); many of these newcomers were peasants from nearby villages like Artana, Betxí, Nules and Vila-real as well as other settlers from the north of the Kingdom of Valencia (Maestrat). Seventy-two years after the expulsion of ethnic Muslims, monks from Caudiel (near Segorbe) built a little church (Església del Replà) which became a sort of meeting point for the inhabitants of this area. With the passing of time, this church led to the unification of the three former villages which became known as les Alqueries, which means "the villages". After the Christian conquest in the 13th century, les Alqueries became part of Vila-real municipality but it gained independence in 1985 after a decree issued by Generalitat Valenciana (Valencian autonomous government).

Les Alqueries has now over 4200 inhabitants and its urban area has grown significantly after the year 2000 becoming a quiet residential area.

== Main sights ==
Les Alqueries is located in a coastal plain, 9 kilometres (5.6 mi) to the Mediterranean sea. Landscape is largely dominated by orange trees. The Serra d'Espadà mountain range (an important protected area) is clearly visible from the village.

The town hall, Casa Safont, a modernist building, and La Plaça de les Pedres square, where the rests of a Roman mill are exposed, are two interesting places for tourists.

== Culture ==
The village has two annual festivals in June and October. Bous al carrer, literally bulls on the street, is the main attraction of October celebrations.

== Twin towns ==
- Sassello, Italy

== See also ==
- List of municipalities in Castellón
