= La Vall d'Uixó =

La Vall d'Uixó Vall de Uxó
- Town and municipality
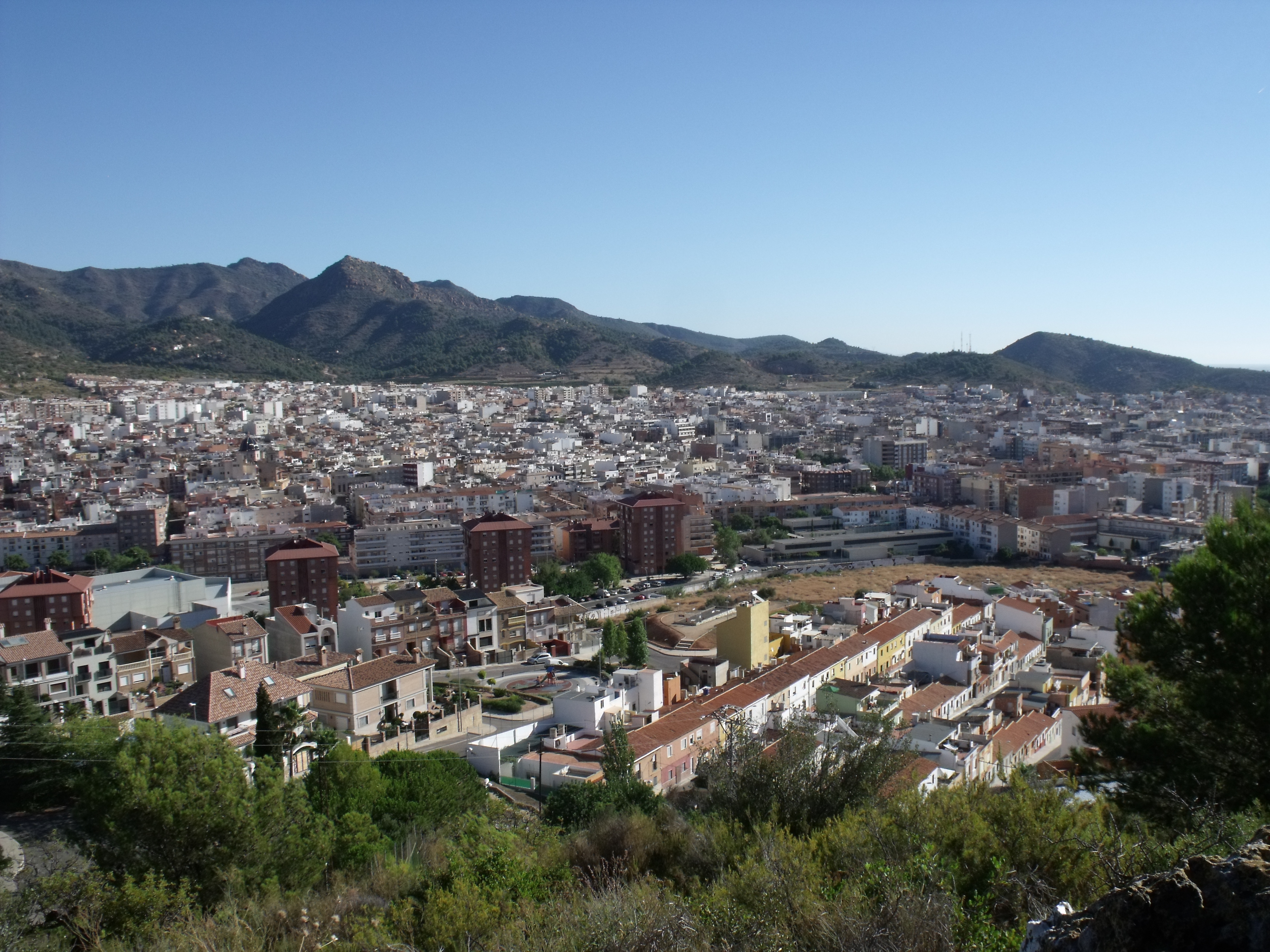

- Flag Coat of arms

- Location of la Vall d'Uixó in the Province of Castellón Location of la Vall d'Uixó in the Valencian Community Location of la Vall d'Uixó in Spain
- Coordinates: 39°49′24.9″N 0°13′54.12″W
- Country: Spain
- Autonomous Community: Valencian Community
- Province: Castellón
- Comarca: Plana Baixa
- Judicial district: Nules
- Founded: 1250

Government
  - Type: Ajuntament
  - Mayor: Tania Baños Martos (PSPV)

Area
  - Total: 67.10 km^{2} (25.91 sq mi)
- Elevation: 118 m (387 ft)

Population (2025-01-01)
  - Total: 32,242
  - Density: 480.5/km^{2} (1,245/sq mi)
- Demonyms: • valler, -a (Val.) • vallero/a (Sp.)
- Official language(s): Valencian; Spanish
- Linguistic area: Valencian

GDP
  - Budget: €30,724,344.68 (2009)
- Time zone: CET (GMT +1)
  - Summer (DST): CEST (GMT +2)
- Postcode: 12600
- Climate: BSh
- Temperatures: 42 °C (highest); 3 °C (lowest)
- Precipitation: 509.51 mm/year
- Website: Official website

La Vall d'Uixó, (Note: Pronunciation of la Vall d'Uixó: Valencian: [la ˈvaʎ dujˈʃo]) (Note: Other names include: Vall Llarga, pronounced [ˈvaʎ ˈʎaɾɣa] Vall Llonga, pronounced [ˈvaʎ ˈʎoŋɡa] Vall del Duc, pronounced [ˈvaʎ del ˈduk]) in Valencian, known simply as la Vall, and unofficially in Spanish as Vall de Uxó, (Note: Pronunciation of Vall de Uxó (unofficial): Spanish: [ˈbal de uˈso]) is a town and municipality situated in eastern Spain, in the Valencian province of Castelló. La Vall is located 25 km to the south of the province's capital Castelló, 45 km to the north of the community's capital Valencia and 8 km to the Mediterranean Sea, and sits at 118 m above sea level.

== History ==
The current territory of la Vall d'Uixó has been occupied since prehistoric times by different human groups. La cova de Sant Josep and other caves in the surrounding area represent the most ancient vestiges in la Vall, from the chronological point of view. The archaeological works in these caves have revealed that they were occupied by hunters of the Upper Paleolithic period, according to a chronology of the C-14, approximately 16,000 years BC. There, two rocky panels were found with representations of cave paintings, giving an idea of the importance of place.

People continued living in the Valley during the Neolithic and Bronze Age. During the Bronze Age grew villages located high in the mountains, well fortified with walls and watchtowers. Its strategic location allowed them to control a vast territory and step into the Serra d'Espadà. The Iberian era was supposed a considerable expansion of the population, as evidenced by the remains of the Iberian city of La Punta d’Orleyl and Poblat Sant Josep.

La Punta d'Orleyl occupies a large area and has four successive lines of walls and towers. Stresses its acropolis, where the remains were located on at least two large public buildings built with huge stones squared. The Poblat de Sant Josep, located at the top of the hill of the same name, represents a good example of the ancient urbanism. It is small but has a wall, two towers, streets and houses of the Iberian and Roman eras. Their time of glory was during the Iberian stages. Years ago, they were occupied during the 4th century AD, and in the end of the Roman Empire.

During Roman times, the population evolved towards agricultural sector. A few years ago was located the remains of a necropolis of burial, which was dated between the 6th and 7th centuries and attached to the Visigothic period. In total we found the remains of 66 individuals with their funerary offerings.

The Arab conquest and the establishment of these populations did not change too much the kind of life. Throughout this long period has been able to document the existence of a dozen villages that are located on both sides of the Belcaire river. These are Alcúdia, Zeneja, Benigafull, Benizahat, Zeneta and Benigasló.Each was independent and had its own industrial area, as well as its necropolis.

The political and legal organization of la Vall was under the chairmanship of Castell d'Uixó. In 1250, la Vall received La Carta Pobla. Since that moment, la Vall become an important city inside the Kingdom of Valencia. This situation did not lead too significant changes, because the Muslim community of la Vall also maintained the structure of society.

La Vall d'Uixó underwent profound changes during this time. Since the expulsion of the Moors in 1609, theoretically, all citizens in la Vall d'Uixó should be replaced by Christians, but it was not entirely so. The Moors retained their houses and continued working the land and carrying out its industrial activities, but under Christian control.

During the 18th century, the population of la Vall increased significantly. The six villages joined each other and they created El poble de Dalt and El poble de Baix. From the 19th century (1860), both little towns formed a central square where the City Hall is located at the present. Throughout the 20th century was the second major economic and demographic expansion.

La Vall attended to a high immigration because of the heavy industrialization of the ancient craft of footwear, lasting in time until the beginning of the 90s. Since then, and after a period of economic crisis due to the closure of this company, la Vall changed its socio-economic structure, which is centred now on the city commerce.

- More information: Ajuntament de la Vall d'Uixó / La Vall d'Uixó City Council

== Geography ==
La Vall d'Uixó is situated in the valley of the Belcaire river, near the Mediterranean Sea. It is located 25 km to the south of the province's capital Castelló, 45 km to the north of the community's capital Valencia and 8 km from the Mediterranean Sea.

Thanks to the huge economic and society development during the last decades, la Vall is one of the most prosperous cities in the province of Castellón.

La Vall d'Uixó is surrounded by a few cities in la Plana Baixa: Almenara, Alfondeguilla, La Llosa, Moncofa, Nules and Xilxes and borders on Valencia's province with Sagunto.

La Vall is surrounded by the following mountains:

Penya Migdia (550 m.), Penya-Creuc (326m.), Ródeno (538 m.), Pinyal (309 m.), Font de Cabres (637 m.), La Pitera (645 m.), Penyalba (648 m.), Pipa (591 m.), El Frontó (621 m.), Sants de la Pedra (585 m.), El Castell (492 m.), Sumet (450 m.), La Balona (456 m.), Penya Garrut (412 m.) and Alto de Cerverola (492 m.).

=== Flora ===
The type of soil is varied and rich. In addition, la Vall has a high level of production of citrus. Also, throughout the municipal district there are carob trees, olives trees, pine trees, white mulberry trees.

=== Belcaire river ===
La Vall citizens used to call it the Barranco de San José. It has many tributaries, like "La rambla de Cerverola", "Barranc de Randero" and "Barranc de l'Alcúdia". Their beds are usually dry throughout the year.

Its source is in the Alfondeguilla mountains, and it flows into the Mediterranean Sea, in Moncofa.

== Demography ==
La Vall d'Uixó has an area of 67.10 km2 and, according to the 2009 official census, la Vall has a population of 33.670 inhabitants. Ranked by population, it is the fourth city in the province of Castellón, after Castelló de la Plana, Vila-real and Borriana.

There are 16,813 men and 16,858 women. The ethnicity groups in la Vall d'Uixó are: Spaniards: 32,976 Foreigners: 695

Demographic evolution of la Vall d'Uixó since 1857 til' 2007
1857	1887	1900	1910	1920	1930	1940	1950	1960	1970	1981	1991	1996	2002	2006	2007
7.229	8.506	8.643	8.856	8.807	9216	9.630	11.712	18.596	24.105	26.145	27.387	28.283	29.871	31.553	31.978

== Culture ==
Being part of the Valencian Community, the common festivities are:

- Falles
- Les Penyes en Festes, since 1982 these celebration are being held in the first week of August.

=== Language ===
According to the Valencian linguistic area, la Vall d'Uixó is part of the Valencian-speaking area.

== Economy and society ==
The current socioeconomic situation of la Vall d'Uixó is the result of the transformation produced in this territory mainly in middle of the last century.

In those years were developed a strong process of economic development and progressive population growth based on the following points:

1. Process of industrialization
2. Transformation process of a rain-fed agriculture to irrigated agriculture based on monoculture citrus.
3. Site of tourism in the "Les Coves de Sant Josep.
4. Population growth with a strong process of immigration.

In the industrial sector, the dominant economic sectors by employment size and the number of companies is the construction sector, followed by the footwear and leather sector. Historical heritage accumulated and preserved throughout the centuries and the proximity of the natural setting Espadán and the Mediterranean coast has allowed projection of the Vall d'Uixó as a tourist town. Historical heritage accumulated and preserved throughout the centuries and the proximity of the natural setting of the Close and Espadán enclaves along the Mediterranean coast to the tourist development has allowed projection of the Vall d'Uixó as a tourist town.

== Politics ==
List of the preceding mayors of la Vall d'Uixó

Legislature	Name of Mayor	Party
1979–1983,	Pedro Navarro Lereu – Vicente Zaragoza,	PCE
1983–1987	Vicente Zaragoza Michavila	PCE
1987–1991	Vicente Zaragoza Michavila	PCE
1991–1995	Ernest Fenollosa i Ten	PSPV-PSOE
1995–1999	Vicent Aparici	PP
1999–2003	Vicent Aparici	PP
2003–2007	Josep Tur i Rubio	PSPV-PSOE
2007–2011	Isabel Bonig	PP
2011–2015	Oscar Clavell	PP
2015–2019	Tania Baños Martos	PSPV-PSOE

== Tourism ==
La Vall d'Uixó has an interesting heritage, especially Les coves de sant Josep (Saint Joseph's caves), which has an important caves painting into it, and it's the largest navigable subterranean river in Europe.

La Vall has two historical city centres, because it is the result of the union of "El poble de Baix", where is the Assumpció Church, and "El poble de Dalt" where is the Àngel Church. Both historical centres preserve its historical structure.

== Monuments ==
=== Religious monuments ===
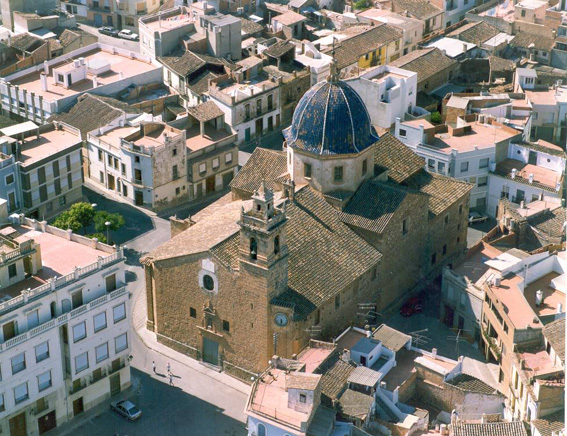
Església de l'Àngel

- Ermita del Santíssim Crist del Calvari (S. XVIII): In the neighbourhood of Carbonaire. Hermitage with ancient glazed tile on its façade.
- Església del Santíssim Crist del Calvari.
- Església de Ntra. Sra. de l'Assumpció. Baroque façade. It was built at the end of the 17th century. La Capilla del Sagrari is very interesting, with old glazed tile. It has an organ recovered as it was destroyed in the civil war.
- Ermita de Sant Vicent Ferrer (S. XVII): In the Sant Vicent Square. Probably it was built over an antique Muslim mezquita.
- Ermita de La Sagrada Família (S. XVIII): In the spot of San José. Next to it, there was one hermitage, now converted into an Information Center
- Ermita de sant Antoni (Built at the end of S. XVII): Situated in the neighbourhood of San Antonio's Group. Once a year, it receives a pilgrimage on the feast of the saint.
- Ermita del Roser: In the neighbourhood of El Roser. It's one of the oldest churches in la Vall.
- Església del sant Àngel. Saint church of El Poble de Dalt.

=== Civil monuments ===
- Torre de Benizahat: Situated on Nostra Senyora de l’Assumpció street. It was built in the 12th century by the Muslim people.
- Hispan-Visigothic necropolis: Situated in La Unió neighbourhood. This necropolis was excavated recently. Eight graves were found with the remains of 66 individuals belonging to the 6th and 7th centuries AD.
- Iberian city of Punta Orley: Remains of a city whose ancient name has not been identified. It was excavated in part. Remains of two large public buildings of stone and four rows of walls belonging to different eras.
- Acueductes de sant Josep i l'Alcúdia: Located in the neighbourhood of El Roser. They are, after Les coves de sant Josep, the most important attraction of the municipality. The aqueduct was built by the Romans. Underwent various repairs in the medieval times.

== Weather ==
During summer, the highest temperatures are in the region of 42 °C, while the lowest temperatures drop to around 3 °C in winter. Annual precipitation is around 509.51 mm. per year.

== Gastronomy ==
The typical la Vall cuisine is influenced by the Valencian cuisine. La paella is a dish that is cooked every Sunday for lunch. However, there are very few dishes typical of this locality. These include:

- Coca en tomata i barrets: They are a typical cold food for festive occasions. It's a special pasta with tomatoes and vegetables.
- Empedrao: Ancient typical hunter meal, which is cooked with pork, rice, beans, shredded beef, rabbit or hare and partridge.
- Manjóvenes: A very light Muslim pasta.
- Panets: They are prepared with figs and almonds, pressed into a mold made for the purpose.
- Arròs al forn: A very traditional dish consisting of ribs, sausages, chickpeas, tomatoes, and rice. Some people add more things

== Sports ==
- La Vall d'Uixó has three football teams: Unión Deportiva Vall de Uxó, Club la Vall and Castell d'Uixó. All of them are playing in regionals leagues. Also has a Tennis Club.

== Notable people ==
- Josep Peirats, anarchist.
- Alex Debón, 250cc rider.
- Tony Ferrer, musician.
- José Mangriñán, football player.
- Arturo Tizón, professional rider.
- Francisco, singer.
- José Font Borrás, founded la Vall's Football Team.
- Jose Vicente Arzó, Silver medal in the Paralympic Games in 2008.
- Sara Sorribes Tormo, tennis player.

== Twin cities ==
- France, Valence d'Agen
- Mexico, Juchitán de Zaragoza
- Western Sahara, Hagunia

== See also ==
- Workers Unitarian Party
