= Santa Quiteria Bridge =

Santa Quiteria Bridge Pont de Santa Quitèria Puente de Santa Quiteria
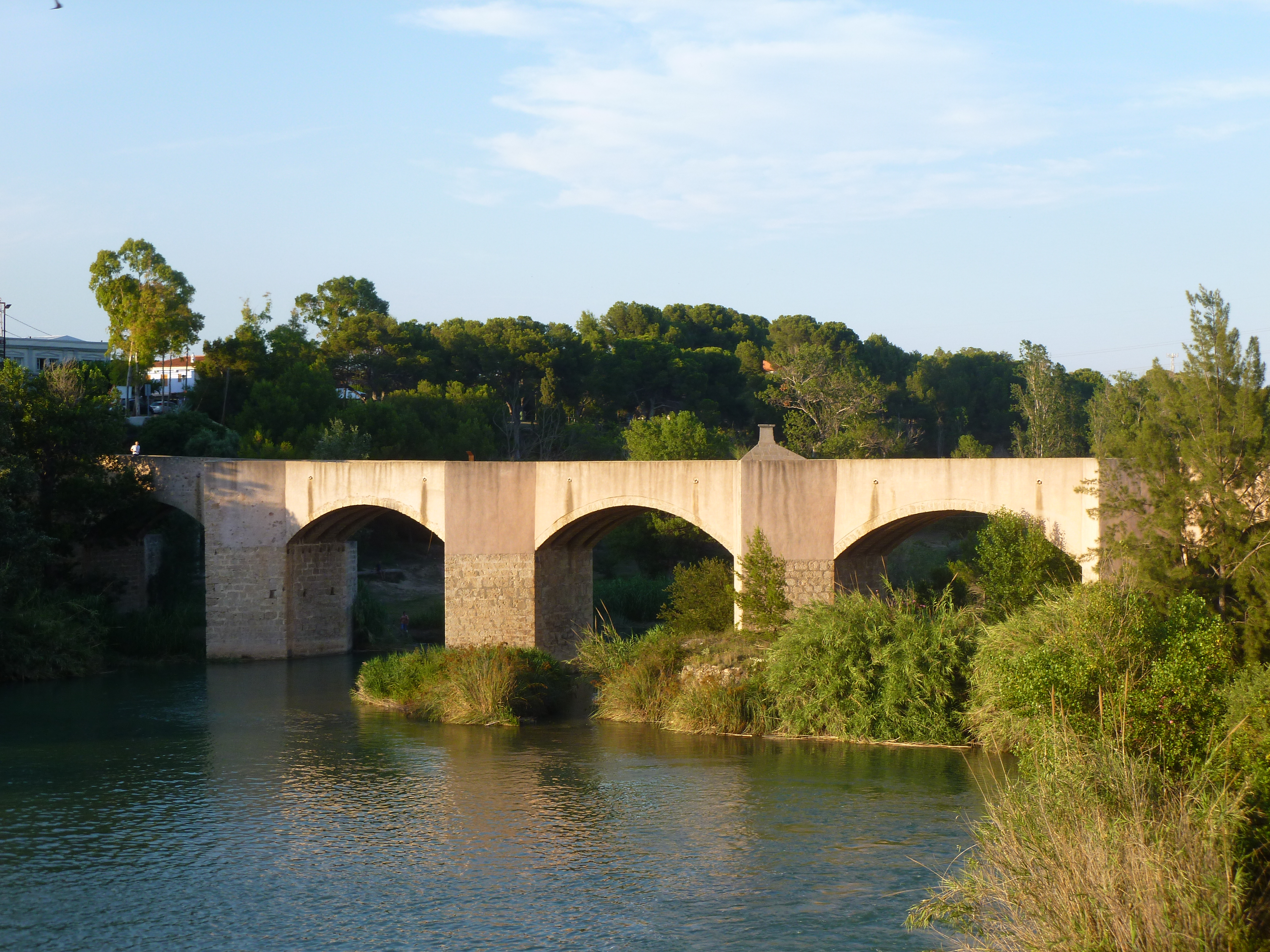
- Coordinates: 39°57′41.5″N 0°6′59.4″W
- Crosses: Mijares River
- Locale: Between Vila-real and Almassora, Castellón Province, Spain
- Heritage status: Bien de interés cultural
- Bien de interés cultural ID: RI-51-0011536

Characteristics
- Material: Stone
- Total length: 125 m (410 ft)
- Width: 3 m (10 ft)
- Height: 9 m (30 ft)

History
- Architect: Pere Dahera

The Santa Quiteria Bridge (Pont de Santa Quitèria in Catalan and Puente de Santa Quiteria in Spanish) is a medieval stone bridge between the towns of Vila-real and Almassora, in the Province of Castellón, Spain, that crosses the Mijares River. It is part of the ancient Royal Road near the Ermita de Santa Quiteria, in Almassora.

The bridge was recognized as Bien de interés cultural (place of cultural interest) on 16 June 2006, and given the designation ID RI-51-0011536.
