= Xilxes/Chilches =

- Municipality
- Flag Coat of arms
- Interactive map of Xilxes/Chilches
- Coordinates: 39°46′N 0°11′W
- Country: Spain
- Autonomous community: Valencian Community
- Province: Castellón
- Comarca: Plana Baixa

Area
  - Total: 13.6 km^{2} (5.3 sq mi)
- Elevation: 7 m (23 ft)

Population (2025-01-01)
  - Total: 3,199
  - Density: 235/km^{2} (609/sq mi)
- Time zone: UTC+1 (CET)
  - Summer (DST): UTC+2 (CEST)
- Postal code: 12592
- Website: http://www.xilxes.es

Xilxes (Valencian) or Chilches (Spanish) is a municipality located in the province of Castellón, Valencian Community, Spain.

== Geography ==
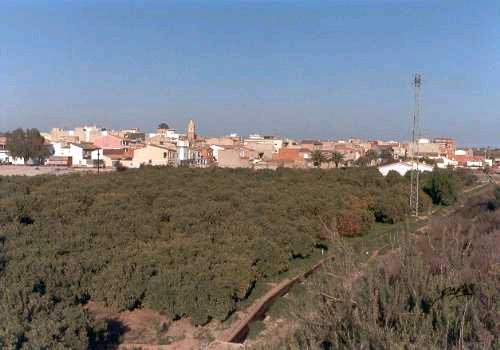

Xilxes/Chilches is located between sea and mountains, in the plain area of La Plana. The village has a warm climate, typical of the mediterranean coast.

Access to Xilxes/Chilches: From Castellón de la Plana by taking the CV-10 then exit number 287. From Valencia the exit is the number 287, then continues to the CV-23. It is possible to arrive to Xilxes/Chilches by train (Cercanías Castellón-Valencia) of Renfe.

Neighbour villages

	North: La Vall d'Uixó, Moncofa	
West: La Vall d'Uixó	Chilches	East: Mediterranean Sea
	South: La Llosa	

=== Neighbourhoods ===
In Xilxes/Chilches there is a neighbourhood located by the sea:

- Beach of Xilxes/Chilches

The Beach of Xilxes/Chilches is located 3,5 km from the village centre. It is accessible by a wide and straight road. The seaside village has two main beaches: El Cerezo and Les Cases, both of sand.

== History ==
The history of Xilxes/Chilches starts in the Roman Age. The village was founded in the year 201 b.C. The discovery of a bronze statue of Mercury demonstrates the village hosted a trail of the Via Augusta. Following the fall of the Roman Empire and the Muslim invasions, Xilxes/Chilches became a Roman-Muslim village constituted by four farmhouses.

In 1238, the village was conquered by Jaime I, who sold Xilxes a year after to Jaime Pérez de Daroca; returned to the Crown and Jaime I sold again the village to Frances de Próxita this time alongside other places that in that time constituted the Baronía de Almenara. In 1256 Xilxes was plundered and burned by rebel Moorish from Sierra Espadán. It was declared "royal villa" by Real Pragmatic of Valencia, issued in Zaragoza on 14 June 1297, and Barony of Chilches, also issued by the Real Pragmatics in Valencia on 13 February 1306. Again, in 1583, it was devastated by Berber pirates who landed on its coast.

The Spanish Civil War (1936-1939) devastated the village and it was rebuilt with the General Direction of Devastated Regions. The village started then to be an urban spot.

== Economy ==
Traditionally based on agriculture (most common cultivation: oranges, melons, tomatoes, rice). Nowadays, Xilxes is developing the tourism and now its beaches are one of the most visited in the province of Castellón. The ceramic tiles industry is also important in the village.

== Monuments ==
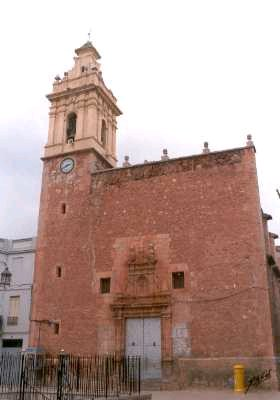
Church of Xilxes

- Church Asunción de Nuestra Señora. Dedicated to the Asunción de Santa María. It has a neoclassic style and preserve its original construction. The current church is a Baroque and neoclassic styles building which construction started at the end of the 17th century. Throughout the history it has been renovated. It is composed by a building with lateral chapels connected between them. Each chapel is dedicated to one of the saints honoured in Xilxes: Sant Vicent, Vírgen de los Dolores, El Cristo de la Junquera and Sant Roc among others. Inside the church there is a chorus above the entrance. The nave is covered by a barrel vault, supported by pilasters of Roman composite order. The transept (intersection of naves in the church) is covered by a dome on an octagonal tambour, supported on pendentives. The cover is made of stone formed by two bodies. The lower one is flanked by Doric pilasters. The upper body is formed by a niche flanked by simple pilasters that support a triangular pediment. To the left of the facade stands the bell tower of square plan. The interior decoration is neoclassical style, with plenty of rockeries, flowerbeds, pendants and medallions. The altarpiece was built after the Spanish Civil War, imitating the Churrigueresque style (excessively ornate). The body is occupied by a niche where stands the image of the Virgin of the Assumption, flanked by pilasters and paired Solomonic columns. The altarpiece the Cristo de la Junquera was built in the atelier of Domingo Llopis in 1959, in Valencia. It was built with wood of albar pine and covered of fine gold.
- Medieval Cimitery. Behind the church there is an ancient cristian cimitery discovered in 2007. The discover dated the elements found between the 13th and 18th centuries.
- La Font de la Unió. It is located in the main square (Plaza España), in front of the church by the underground. It was the first fountain with good water of the village (1916). It was rebuilt in 1986 by local citizens.

== Points of Interest ==
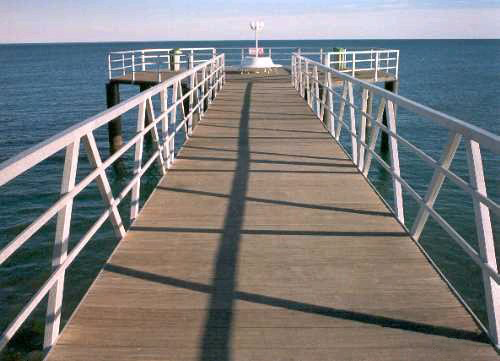
Sea Viewpoint at Xilxes Beach

- Sea Promenade. It has a longitude of 1500 metres. Used by pedestrians, it combines both pavement and garden areas. The sea view point is in the centre of the beach neighbourhood and it gets into the sea about 100 metres.
- Playa de El Cerezo. 820m beach. Blue Flag. It has been recognised as one of the most accessible beaches of Spain, as it is free accessible for people with reduced mobility.
- Playa de Les Cases. 532m beach. Blue Flag.
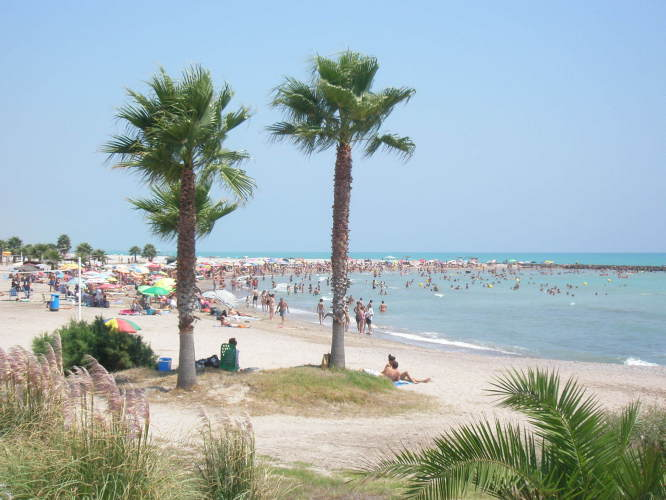
  Xilxes. Les Cases Beach
- La Marjal. At the east of the village, nearby the beach district, there is a wetland with a high environmental value.
- Ermita del Santísimo Cristo de la Junquera. This little church was built in the place where, according to the history, the Margalló brothers founded an image of the Christ on 18 January 1625 on the shore of a bulrush, now the patron saint of Xilxes. The church is located about 1 km from the village, in the Partida Les Xovaes. Accessible by following the Camí Els Horts and Camí l'Ermita.

== Festivities ==
"Bous al carrer"

- Sant Vicent Ferrer. Popular festivities starting generally the week after Easter Holidays. There are shows and different activities as bous al career, orchestras, concerts, religious acts, popular games and dinners, theatre shows, fireworks, etc.
- Sant Roc. Popular festivities celebrated in the beach district. They start generally on the Saturday before 15 August.
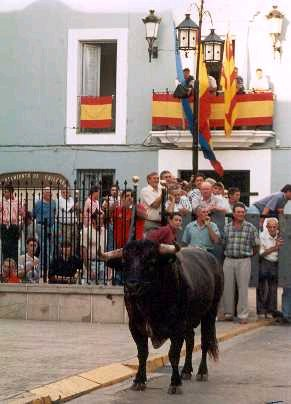
  Bous al Carrer Xilxes
- Main festivities. Honouring the Holy Christ of La Junquera. Celebrated around mid September. They offer a wide variety of popular and religious activities (bous al carrer, concerts, local theatre, popular games and dinners, fireworks, etc.).

== Gastronomy ==
Typical gastronomy from the Valencian Community.

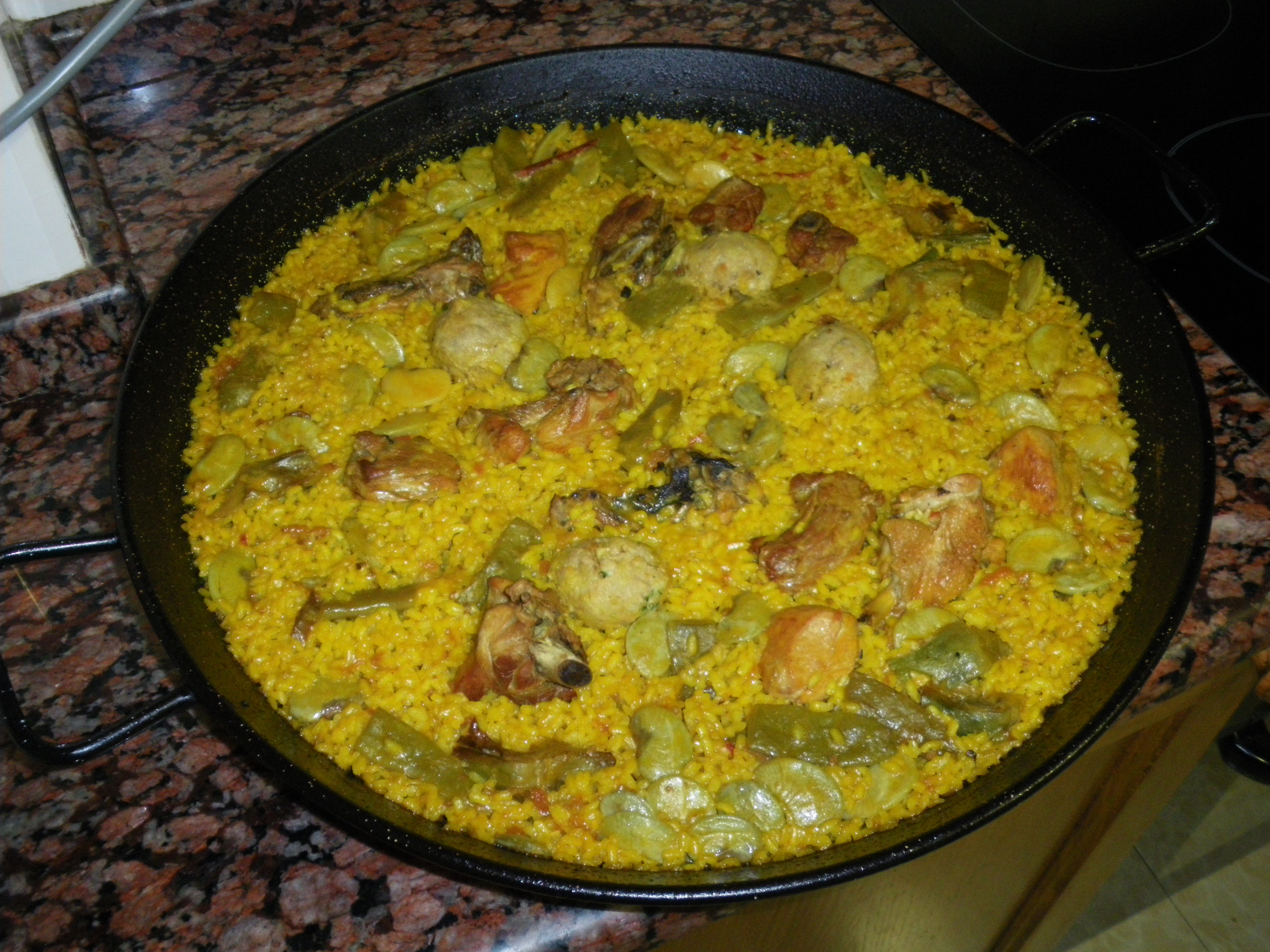
Valencian Paella

- Valencian Paella
- Fideuà
- Seafood Rice
- Arròs amb fesols i naps
- Coca de tomata
- Barret de verdura
- Rotllets d'anís
- Rosquilletes
- Pilotes de frare

Associació Cultural Ràfol Xilxes

Xilxes Tourism Official Website
