= Santa Quitéria =

Santa Quitéria may refer to:

== Places ==
- Santa Quitéria, Ceará, a municipality in Brazil
- Santa Quitéria do Maranhão, a municipality in Maranhão, Brazil
- Santa Quitéria River, Brazil
- Santa Quiteria Bridge, in the Province of Castellón, Spain
- Santa Quitéria, Funchal

== Other ==
- Saint Quiteria, 5th-century virgin martyr
- Santa Quitéria Futebol Clube, Brazil
