= Isabel Martínez Blaya =

- Born: 1914; Vall de Uxó, Spain
- Died: March 18, 1989; Castellón de la Plana, Spain
- Occupations: Feminist, anti-fascist, politician
- Known for: Militiwoman in the Spanish Civil War; Member of the Unified Socialist Youth and the Socialist Party of the Valencian Country–PSOE
- Spouse: Fernando Flores Goterris
- Children: Fernando, Maribel, Alicia

Isabel Martínez Blaya (Vall de Uxó, 1914 – Castellón de la Plana, March 18, 1989) was a Spanish feminist, militiwoman, anti-fascist, and politician.

With the establishment of democracy in Spain, she became Secretary of Social Services of the Local Executive Committee of the Socialist Party of the Valencian Country–PSOE (PSPV–PSOE) in Castellón.

== Biography ==
Isabel Martínez Blaya was born in Vall de Uxó. From an early age, she was involved in politics as a member of the Unified Socialist Youth (JSU). The organization was created by merging socialist and communist youth groups and was formally founded in March 1936.

At the start of the Spanish Civil War, at age 22, Martínez enlisted as a militiwoman to fight on the Teruel front with the Matteotti Column. Alongside her fellow towns-woman Rosa Fenollosa, she declared her desire to take up arms against fascism and refused to enroll as a nurse in the medical service, unwilling to be relegated from direct combat. They went to the front after undergoing firearms training.

When women were later banned from serving at the front, Martínez and others went to Castellón, where she joined the Provincial Committee of the JSU. She helped establish the anti-fascist youth organization Unión de Muchachas ("Union of Young Women"). This group had been founded in Madrid in May 1937 by the JSU with the aim of uniting left-wing young women and training them to actively assist the Popular Front government in winning the war.

In Castellón, the provincial secretariat was headed by Milagros Segarra as president, with Martínez as Secretary of Organization. The sections for Agitation and Propaganda, Culture, Sports, Aid, Agriculture and Production, and Administration were led respectively by Emilia Betoret, Clara Díaz, Pepa Perona, Teresa Vives, Lola Mañá, and Vicenta Navarro—most of them JSU members.

One of Martínez's main roles, sometimes acting as chairwoman, was organizing aid for evacuated women arriving from across Spain, many with dependents and no employment. She worked to find them jobs and denounced the reluctance of many men, who feared that after the war they would not regain the positions women were taking. This sometimes led to obstruction of women entering various workplaces.

In a 1938 newspaper interview, Martínez discussed women's entry into the workforce in Castellón:

"I think everything depends on the trade unions’ leadership. They say we are not qualified. This is true only to a point: unions must take steps to organize, through intensive training or proper schools, the rapid preparation of thousands of women for the jobs most needed at this time. For example, the mechanical training courses held last summer produced about fifty or sixty women who are now working very efficiently in our war factories, replacing men. Also, the driving courses currently being held in different places will prepare many women chauffeurs." (Heraldo de Castellón, 1938)

On the issue of women's pay, she stated:

"I believe that if a woman performs the same job as a comrade she replaces, her wage should be equal to his." (Heraldo de Castellón, 1938).

During the early years of Francoism, she was imprisoned in the former convent of La Misericordia in Burriana, together with her friend María Rosa Fenollosa and other Republican women. In 1940 she was sentenced to thirty years in prison for "adhesion to the rebellion" and transferred to the Saturrarán women's prison in Motrico. Later she was moved to the Special Reformatory for Women of Santa María del Puig, in Valencia. She was released in 1945.

Her name appeared on the 1979 municipal election list of the PSOE in the Castellón de la Plana City Council, and again in 1983 for the same party, in position twenty-four.

In 1984, during the First Assembly of Socialist militants of the local Castellón group, and under her presidency, the "Women and Socialism Commission" was established.

Her husband was Fernando Flores Goterris, with whom she had three children: Fernando, Maribel, and Alicia.

She died at age 74 on March 18, 1989, in Castellón de la Plana, and her tomb lies in the Sant Josep cemetery.
