= Autovía CV-10 =

Motorway in Spain

Autovía CV-10
- Autovía de la Plana
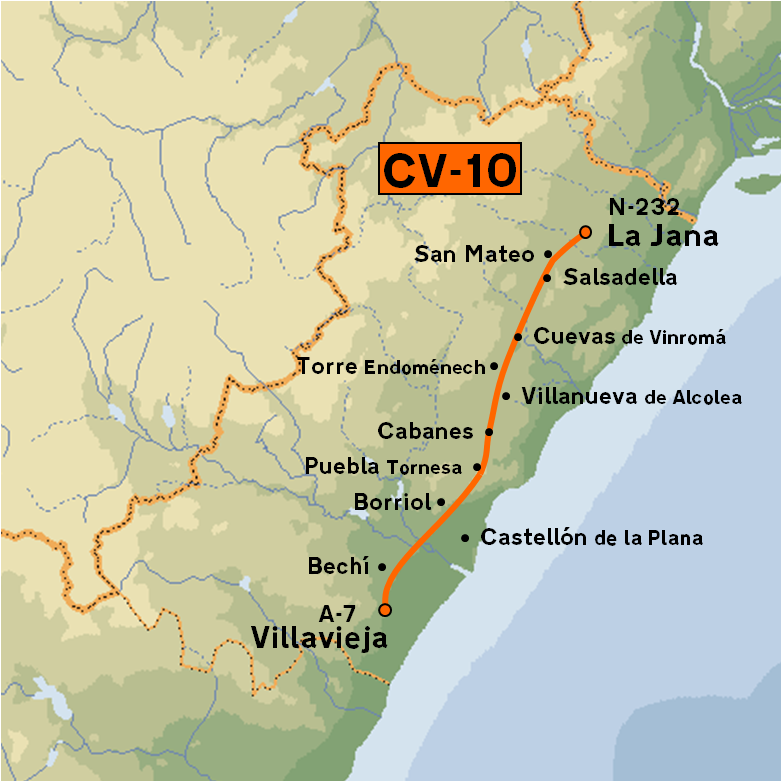

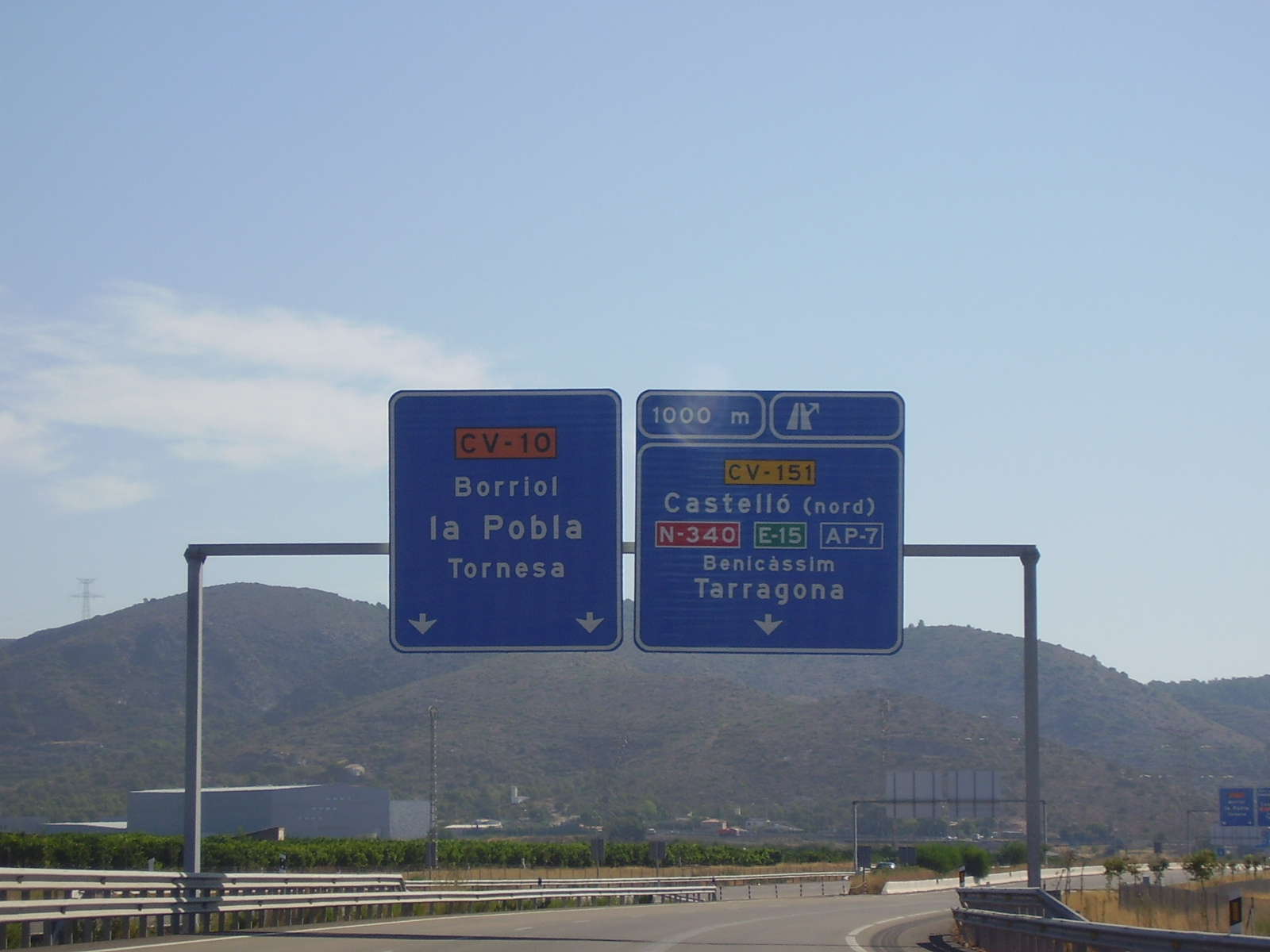

Route information
- Length: 82 km (51 mi)

Major junctions
- From: A-31 (La Vilavella)
- To: N-232 (La Jana)

Location
- Country: Spain

Highway system
- Highways in Spain; Autopistas and autovías; National Roads

The Autovía CV-10, also called Autovía de la Plana, is a Spanish motorway in the Valencian Community. It runs through the province of Castellón from south to north, connecting the A-7 in La Vilavella with the N-232 in La Jana.

== Nomenclature ==
Indicator

This road is unfolded until Cabanes.

The CV-10 road belongs to the road network of the Generalitat Valenciana. Its name is formed by the CV code, which indicates that it is an autonomous road of the Valencian Community and the digit 10, a number that it receives according to the order of nomenclatures of the CV roads.

The CV-10 Autovía de la Plana is, in theory, part of the A-7 Autovía del Mediterráneo, but having been developed and maintained by the Generalitat Valenciana, it has the nomenclature referring to the autonomous roads of the Valencian Community.

When the section of the A-7 highway between Castellón–Costa Azahar Airport and La Jana is completed, the entire route will be included in the Mediterranean Highway, taking as the only nomenclature that of A-7, and communicating Valencia, Castellón de la Plana and Tarragona through La Pobla Tornesa and La Jana.

== History ==
CV-10 is the name given to the union of several highways with old nomenclature, such as CS-222, CS-V-8501, C-238, CS-850 and CS-233, which linked locally, municipalities such as Bechí, Villavieja or Puebla-Tornesa, among others. Now they have all been unified, to go to a road that crosses the entire province (from Almenara to La Jana) without interruption.

Currently, the section between the A-7 in Almenara and the CV-13 in Villanueva de Alcolea is unfolded, and therefore it is a highway.

- 22 October 2010: Official opening of the section of highway between La Pobla Tornesa and Cabanes. Only the opening of 2 kilometers of highway that will connect with the CV-13 and the airport remains.
- 21 December 210: Inauguration of the CV-13 highway that connects the current end of the highway with the AP-7 toll road at the height of Torreblanca.
