= Moncofa Beach Residents =

Spanish political party

Moncofa Beach Residents (in Spanish: Residentes Playa Moncofa or RPM) is a political party in the municipality of Moncofa, Castellón, Spain. The party was founded by two neighbourhood associations in the Playa Moncofa area, and joined by business-owners at the beach area. The president of the party is Salvador Faus.

The political party was registered on 26 December 2002. At the 2003 municipal election, the party list was topped by José Ferrando Alemany, followed by Carmen Rubio and Salvador Faus. The party received 215 votes (7.25%), insufficient to win a seat.
