= Tales, Spain =

Tales
- Municipality
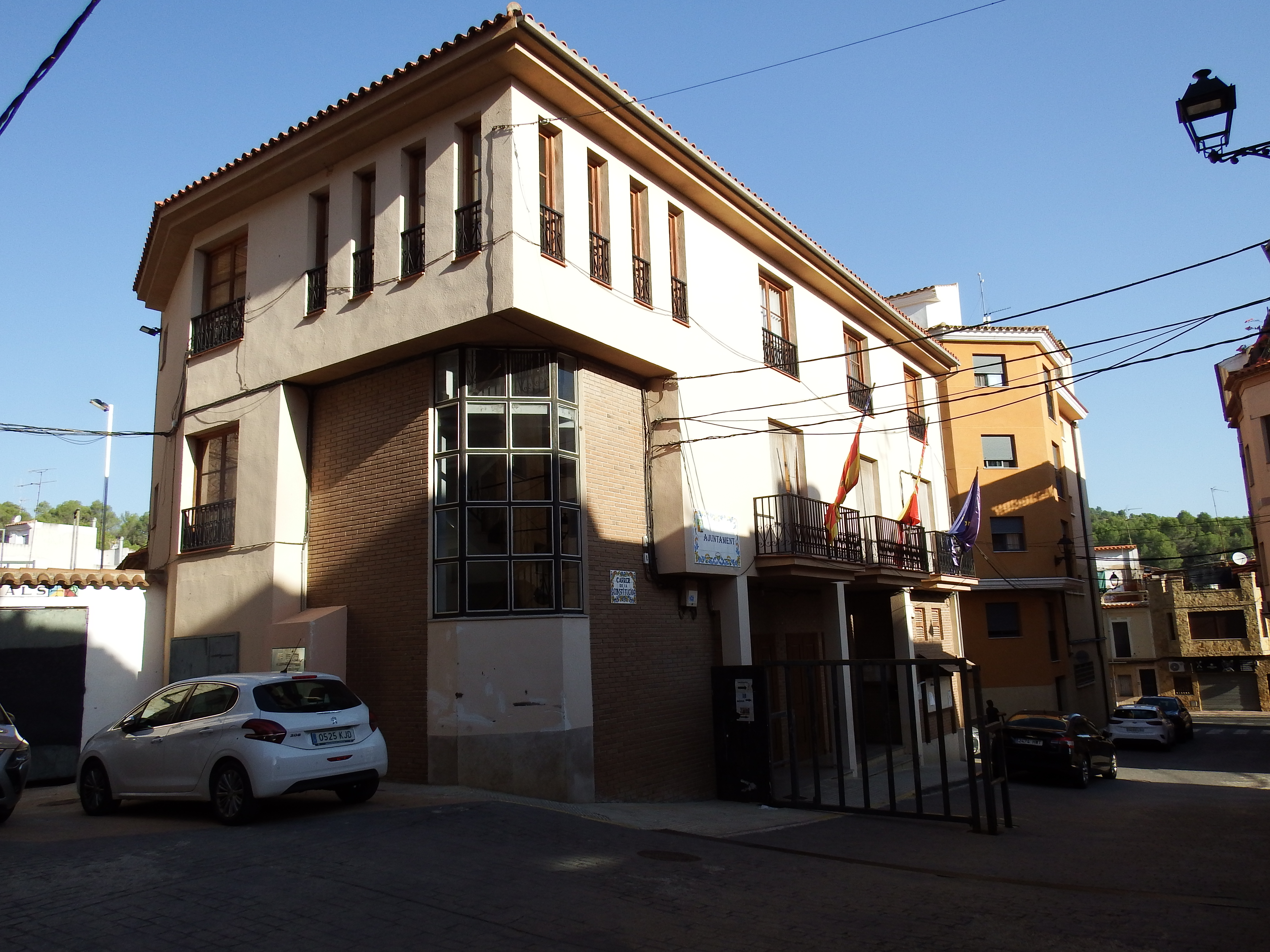
- Town hall

- Coat of arms
- Interactive map of Tales
- Coordinates: 39°56′57″N 0°18′26″W
- Country: Spain
- Autonomous community: Valencian Community
- Province: Castellón
- Comarca: Plana Baixa

Area
  - Total: 14.5 km^{2} (5.6 sq mi)
- Elevation: 242 m (794 ft)

Population (2025-01-01)
  - Total: 827
  - Density: 57.0/km^{2} (148/sq mi)
- Time zone: UTC+1 (CET)
  - Summer (DST): UTC+2 (CEST)
- Postal code: 12221
- Website: http://www.tales.es

Tales is a municipality located in the province of Castellón, Valencian Community, Spain.
