= Robert Juan-Cantavella =

Spanish writer (born 1976)

Robert Juan-Cantavella is a Spanish writer born in Almassora in 1976. Currently he lives in Barcelona. He worked as editor-in-chief at the Spanish cultural magazine Lateral.

Books

- Asesino Cósmico (Cosmic Killer), novel, Random House-Mondadori, Barcelona, 2011.
- El Dorado, novel, Random House-Mondadori, Barcelona, 2008. El Dorado is a parodical, political, punk adventure novel.
- Proust Fiction, short-story collection, Poliedro, Barcelona, 2005. The main story, "Proust Fiction", tells how Quentin Tarantino was plagiarized by Marcel Proust.
- Otro, novel, Laia Libros, Barcelona, 2001. Experimental novel.
