= Alcudia de Veo =

Alcudia de Veo L'Alcúdia de Veo
- Municipality
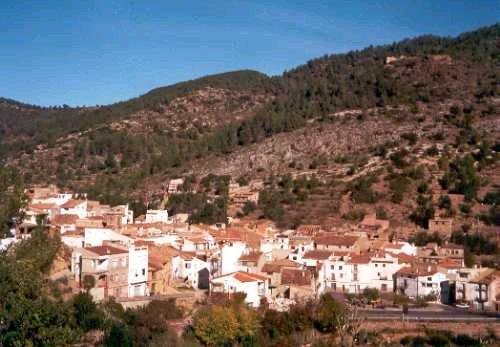
- Panorama.

- Flag Coat of arms

- Location in Spain
- Coordinates: 39°54′57″N 0°21′18″W
- Country: Spain
- Autonomous community: Valencian Community
- Province: Castelló
- Comarca: Plana Baixa
- Judicial district: Nules

Government
  - Mayor: Carmen Alós Herrera

Area
  - Total: 30.7 km^{2} (11.9 sq mi)
- Elevation: 465 m (1,526 ft)

Population (2025-01-01)
  - Total: 200
  - Density: 6.5/km^{2} (17/sq mi)
- Time zone: UTC+1 (CET)
  - Summer (DST): UTC+2 (CEST)
- Postal code: 12222
- Website: Official website

Alcudia de Veo is a town in eastern Spain, in the comarca of Plana Baixa and the province of Castelló, part of the autonomous community of Valencia, on the northern side of the Serra d'Espadà. It is crossed by the Veo River.

Castilian is the language mostly spoken in Alcudia de Veo proper, while Valencian is spoken in the parishes of Veo and Benitandús. Alcudia is home to a Moorish-origin castle; ruins of another castle exist in the abandoned village of Xinquer.

== See also ==
- List of municipalities in Castellón
