= Bruno Soriano =

Spanish footballer (born 1984)

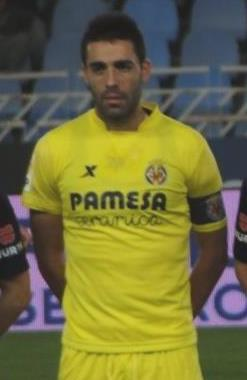
- Soriano with Villarreal in 2015

Personal information
- Full name: Bruno Soriano Llido
- Date of birth: 12 June 1984 (age 42)
- Place of birth: Artana, Spain
- Height: 1.79 m (5 ft 10 1/2 in)
- Position: Defensive midfielder

Youth career
- 1992–1993: Artana
- 1993–1997: Betxí
- 1997–2001: Villarreal
- 2001–2003: Artana

Senior career*
Years	Team	Apps	(Gls)
2003–2005	Villarreal C		
2004–2007	Villarreal B	57	(0)
2006–2020	Villarreal	324	(25)
Total		381	(25)

International career
2010–2016	Spain	10	(0)
- * Club domestic league appearances and goals

Bruno Soriano Llido (Spanish pronunciation: [ˈbɾuno soˈɾjano ˈʎiðo]; born 12 June 1984) is a Spanish former professional footballer who played as a defensive midfielder.

He spent his entire career with Villarreal since making his first appearance with the first team in 2006, and played 425 official games for them. He missed nearly three whole seasons in his later career due to injury.

Soriano made his debut for Spain in 2010, and represented the nation at Euro 2016.

== Club career ==
Born in Artana, Province of Castellón, Valencian Community, Soriano joined Villarreal CF's youth system at the age of 13, but left the club four years later to return to his hometown. He then played for local side Artana CF in the regional leagues before returning to Villarreal in 2003, where he featured for the third and second teams.

Soriano made his debut for the first team on 15 July 2006, in a 1–2 home loss to NK Maribor in the UEFA Intertoto Cup. His La Liga occurred on 1 October, in a 2–1 away win against RCD Mallorca.

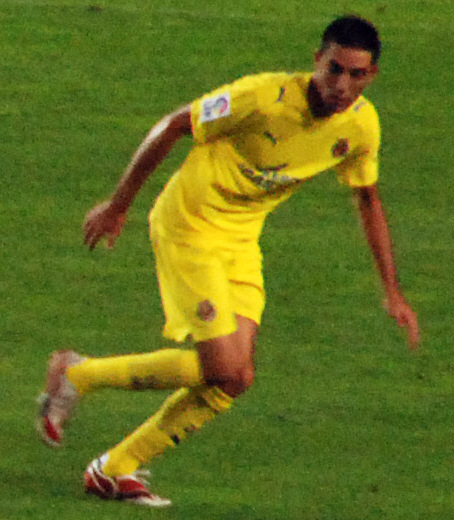
Soriano playing for Villarreal in 2008

Soriano made a permanent switch to the main squad in 2007–08, and was a regular fixture in the side's callups throughout the season, though not a regular starter. On 14 November 2007, he scored his first professional goal, in a 4–2 victory at UD Las Palmas in the round of 32 of the Copa del Rey; he had the same status the following year, as the Yellow Submarine qualified for the UEFA Europa League in fifth place.

In 2009–10, Soriano became first-choice for Villarreal, finally winning the battle for starting duties over Uruguayan Sebastián Eguren. He only missed one game in 38 the following campaign, with the club finishing fourth and returning to the UEFA Champions League.

In the 2012 off-season, shortly after suffering relegation, Soriano received a €9 million offer from neighbouring Valencia CF, which he rejected in order to stay and help achieve promotion, also signing a new four-year contract until 2020. In 2013–14, with Villarreal back in the top flight, he scored a career-best six goals – three through penalty kicks – to help his team finish in sixth position and qualify to the Europa League.

On 31 December 2015, Soriano netted through a superbly taken free kick to help defeat Valencia 1–0 at the Estadio El Madrigal. The following matchday, he scored both of his team's goals in 2–1 away win against Deportivo de La Coruña, the second coming through an injury-time penalty.

Soriano spent the 2017–18 and 2018–19 seasons and most of 2019–20 on the sidelines, due to a knee injury. He finally made his return against Sevilla FC, on 22 June 2020.

On 19 July 2020, aged 36, Soriano retired from football.

== International career ==
On 5 August 2010, Vicente del Bosque named Soriano as one of the three new players for the Spanish team after the victorious FIFA World Cup in South Africa, for a friendly with Mexico. He made his debut on the 11th, playing 61 minutes in the 1–1 draw in Mexico City.

On 17 May 2016, Soriano was included in a provisional squad of 25 for the UEFA Euro 2016 tournament, and also made the final list. He made his debut in the competition on 17 June at the age of 32, coming on as a 64th-minute substitute for David Silva in a 3–0 group stage win against Turkey at the Allianz Riviera.

== Career statistics ==
=== Club ===
Appearances and goals by club, season and competition
Club	Season	League			Cup		Continental		Total	
Club	Season	Division	Apps	Goals	Apps	Goals	Apps	Goals	Apps	Goals
Villarreal	2006–07	La Liga	3	0	1	0	1	0	5	0
Villarreal	2007–08	La Liga	21	0	4	1	6	0	31	1
Villarreal	2008–09	La Liga	25	0	2	0	7	0	34	0
Villarreal	2009–10	La Liga	33	0	4	0	6	0	43	0
Villarreal	2010–11	La Liga	37	0	4	0	15	0	56	0
Villarreal	2011–12	La Liga	37	3	2	0	7	0	46	3
Villarreal	2012–13	Segunda División	36	4	1	0	–		37	4
Villarreal	2013–14	La Liga	36	6	3	0	–		39	6
Villarreal	2014–15	La Liga	24	2	5	1	8	2	37	5
Villarreal	2015–16	La Liga	31	5	2	0	12	2	45	7
Villarreal	2016–17	La Liga	34	5	1	0	10	1	45	6
Villarreal	2017–18	La Liga	0	0	0	0	0	0	0	0
Villarreal	2018–19	La Liga	0	0	0	0	0	0	0	0
Villarreal	2019–20	La Liga	7	0	0	0	–		7	0
Career total			324	25	29	2	72	5	425	32

=== International ===
Appearances and goals by national team and year
National team	Year	Apps	Goals
Spain	2010	1	0
Spain	2011	1	0
Spain	2012	2	0
Spain	2014	2	0
Spain	2016	4	0
Spain	Total	10	0

== See also ==
- List of one-club men
