= Plana Baixa =

Coordinates: 39°50′39.82″N 0°9′2.58″W

Plana Baixa Plana Baja
- Comarca
- Country: Spain
- Autonomous community: Valencian Community
- Province: Castelló / Castellón
- Capital: Borriana / Burriana
- Municipalities: 20 municipalities: Aín, L'Alcúdia de Veo, Alfondeguilla, Almenara, Les Alqueries, Artana, Betxí, Borriana / Burriana, Xilxes, Eslida, La Llosa, Moncofa, Nules, Onda, Ribesalbes, Suera/Sueras, Tales, La Vall d'Uixó, Vila-real, La Vilavella

Area
  - Total: 605.15 km^{2} (233.65 sq mi)

Population (2019)
  - Total: 190,925
  - Density: 315.50/km^{2} (817.14/sq mi)
- Time zone: UTC+1 (CET)
  - Summer (DST): UTC+2 (CEST)
- Most populated municipality: Vila-real

Plana Baixa (Valencian: [ˈplana ˈbajʃa]; Spanish: Plana Baja [ˈplana ˈβaxa]) is a comarca in the province of Castellón, Valencian Community, Spain.

The main source of water for irrigation in the area is the Millars River.

== Municipalities ==
The comarca is composed of 20 municipalities, listed below with their populations at the 2001 and 2011 Censuses, and according to the latest official estimates:

Name	Population (2001)	Population (2011)	Population (2019)
Aín	155	139	127
L'Alcúdia de Veo	199	221	190
Alfondeguilla	921	879	866
Almenara	4,947	6,059	5,998
Les Alqueries	3,594	4,452	4,449
Artana	1,870	1,956	1,947
Betxí	5,315	5,772	5,645
Borriana / Burriana	26,757	35,044	34,683
Xilxes	2,347	2,853	2,679
Eslida	764	917	759
La Llosa	908	949	951
Moncofa	4,024	6,390	6,525
Nules	11,542	13,549	13,103
Onda	20,019	25,089	24,859
Ribesalbes	1,262	1,320	1,174
Suera / Sueras	575	634	525
Tales	724	897	825
La Vall d'Uixó	28,964	32,733	31,660
La Vilavella	3,363	3,279	3,157
Vila-real	42,442	50,747	50,893

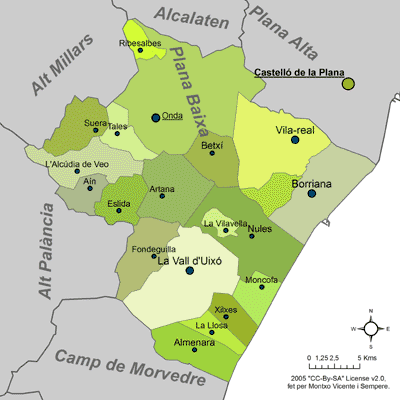
Municipalities of Plana Baixa
