= Rosita Amores =

Spanish singer

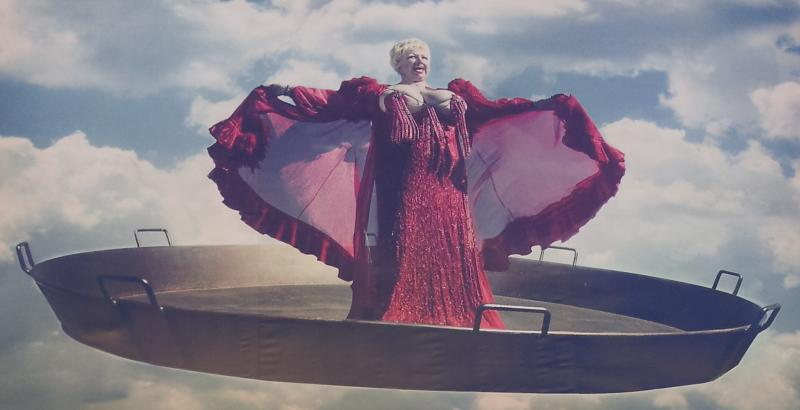
Mural at the Carrer Corretgeria in the city of València, with Rosita rising from a paella

Rosa Amores Valls, born in Nules, Spain, on 26 January 1938, is a Spanish singer, known for her burlesque performances and variety shows. Her stage name is Rosita Amores. Amores is one of the leading variety performers and erotic artists of Valencia, and gained fame during the 1960s and 1970s.

== Films ==
- El virgo de Visanteta (1979). Dir. Vicente Escrivá
- Gracias por la propina (1997). Dir. Francesc Bellmunt
- Visanteta, estáte quieta (1979). Dir. Vicente Escrivá
- Con el culo al aire (1980). Dir. Carles Mira
- Un negro con un saxo (1988). Dir. Francesc Bellmunt
- El robo más grande jamás contado (2002) Dir. Daniel Monzón
