= Suera / Sueras =

Sueras/Suera
- Municipality
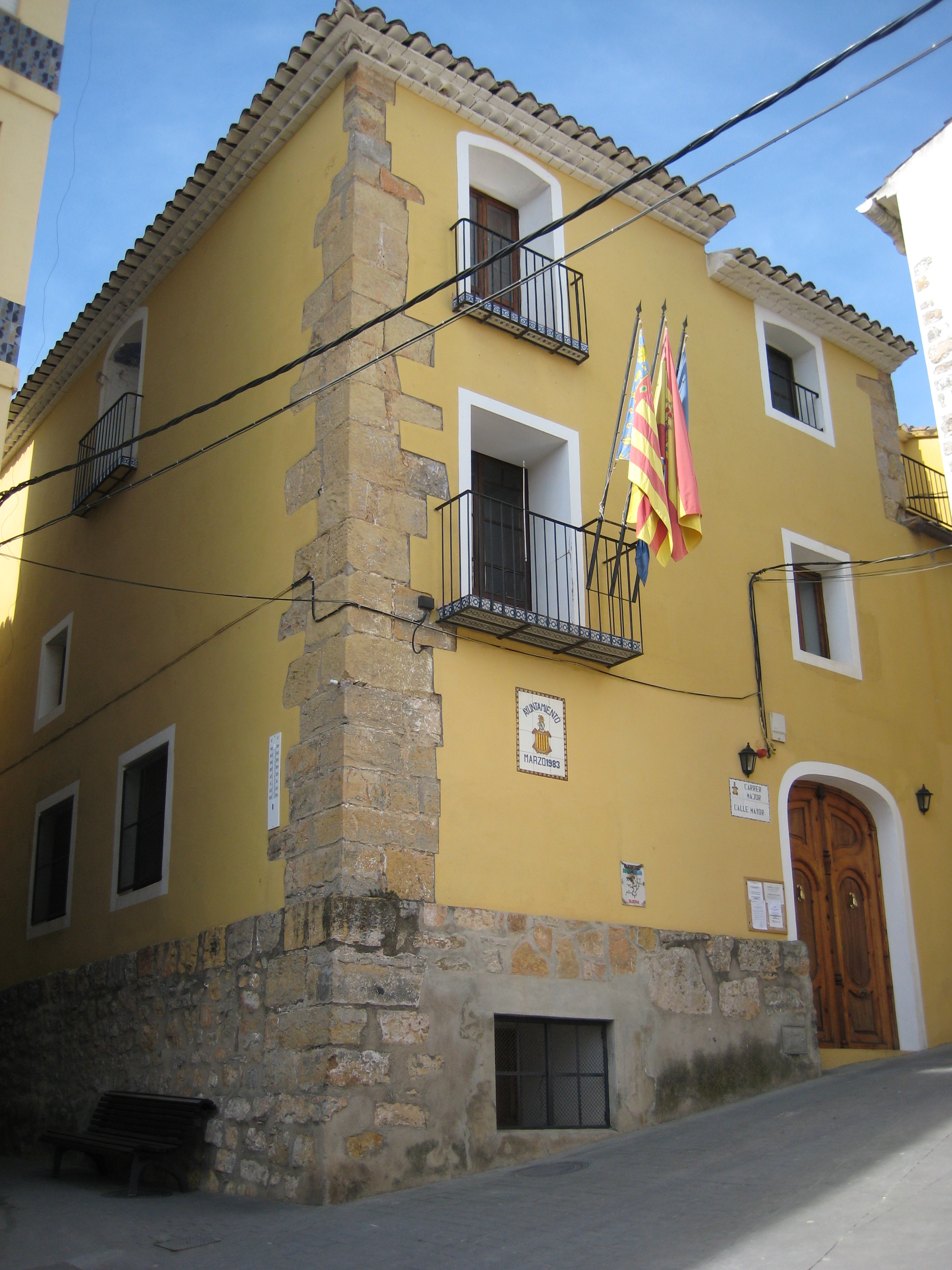
- Town hall

- Flag Coat of arms

- Location in Spain Sueras/Suera (Valencian Community)
- Coordinates: 39°57′7″N 0°19′56″W
- Country: Spain
- Autonomous community: Valencian Community
- Province: Castellón
- Comarca: Plana Baixa
- Judicial district: Nules

Government
  - Alcalde: José Pascual Martí García (2024) (PSOE)

Area
  - Total: 22.22 km^{2} (8.58 sq mi)
- Elevation: 316 m (1,037 ft)

Population (2023)
  - Total: 572
  - Density: 25.7/km^{2} (66.7/sq mi)
- Demonym: Suerense/a
- Time zone: UTC+1 (CET)
  - Summer (DST): UTC+2 (CEST)
- Postal code: 12223
- Official language(s): Valencian and Spanish
- Website: Official website

Sueras (Spanish: [ˈsweɾas]) or Suera (Valencian: [suˈeɾa]) is a municipality in the comarca of Plana Baixa in the Valencian Community, Spain.
