= 71st Division (Spain) =

- 71.ª División
- Active: September 1937–March 1939
- Country: Spain
- Allegiance: (Second Spanish Republic) Republican faction
- Branch: Spanish Republican Army
- Type: Infantry
- Size: Division
- Garrison/HQ: Albuñol
- Engagements: Spanish Civil War

The 71st Division was one of the divisions of the People's Army of the Republic that were organized during the Spanish Civil War on the basis of the Mixed Brigades. It came to operate on the Andalusian and Extremadura fronts.

== History ==
The unit was created in September 1937, on the Andalusian coastline. Its headquarters were in Albuñol. Some time after its creation the division was integrated into the XXIII Army Corps. Later it became a reserve of the Andalusian Army. In May 1938 members of the division led the liberation of more than three hundred republican prisoners from Carchuna, in the nationalist rear. In mid-August 1938 the Republican command sent it as reinforcement to the Extremadura front, to the sector defended by the 29th Division.

== Command ==
Commanders

- Bartolomé Muntané Cirici;
- Luis Bárzana Bárzana;
- José Torralba Ordóñez;
- Carlos Cuerda Gutiérrez;

Commissars

- José Piñeiro Zambrano, of the CNT;

Chiefs of Staff

- Frumencio Sanmartín López;

== Organization ==
Date	Attached Army Corps	Integrated Mixed Brigades	Battle front
December 1937	XXIII Army Corps	55th, 221st	Andalusia
April 30, 1938	XXIII Army Corps	54th, 55th, 221st	Andalusia
August 16, 1938	VI Army Corps	73rd, 198th, 199th	Estremadura

== Bibliography ==
- Alpert, Michael (1989). El Ejército Republicano en la Guerra Civil (in Spanish). Madrid: Siglo XXI de España. ISBN 9788432306822.
- Álvarez, Santiago (1989). Los comisarios políticos en el Ejército Popular de la República (in Spanish). Ediciós do Castro.
- Cancio, Raúl C. (2011). Fuerzas especiales en la Guerra Civil Española (in Spanish). Madrid: Ministerio de Defensa.
- Engel, Carlos (1999). Historia de las Brigadas Mixtas del Ejército Popular de la República (in Spanish). Madrid: Almena. ISBN 84-922644-7-0.
- Martínez Bande, José Manuel (1981). La batalla de Pozoblanco y el cierre de la bolsa de Mérida (in Spanish). Madrid: Editorial San Martín.
