= Mascarell =

Coordinates: 39°52′N 0°08′W

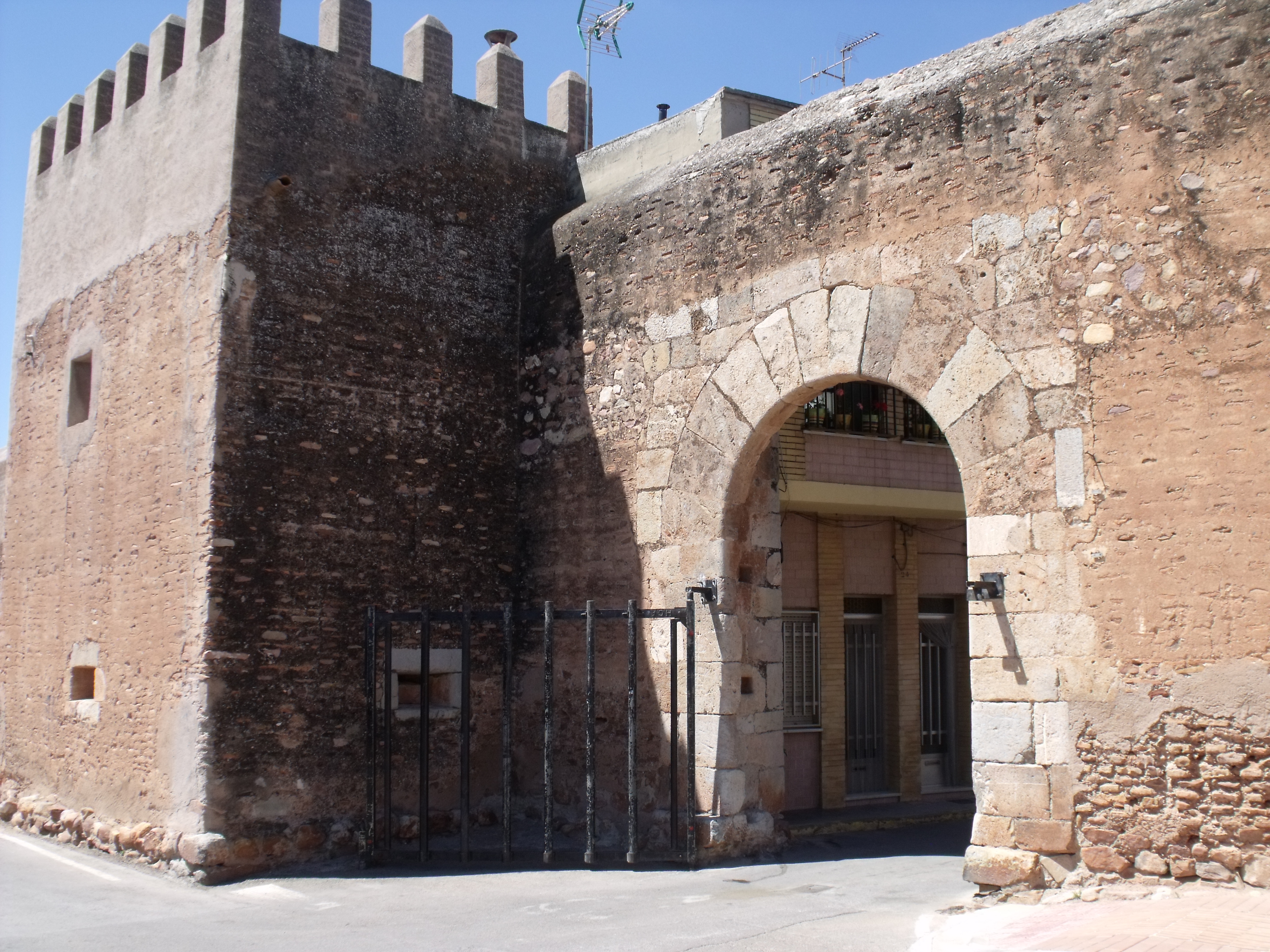
- Interactive map of Mascarell
- Country: Spain
- Province: Castelló
- Municipality: Nules

Population (2017)
  - Total: 211
- Time zone: UTC+1 (CET)
  - Summer (DST): UTC+2 (CEST)

Also see Sacred (video game) and Sacred 3, both having fictional town of the same name.

Mascarell is a village in Nules, Castelló, Spain.
