= Pere Martí =

Spanish footballer and manager

Personal information
- Full name: Pere Martí Castelló
- Date of birth: 22 January 1982 (age 44)
- Place of birth: Moncofa, Spain
- Height: 1.75 m (5 ft 9 in)
- Position: Defensive midfielder

Youth career
- Villarreal

Senior career*
Years	Team	Apps	(Gls)
2001–2003	Villarreal B		
2003–2004	Villarreal	34	(1)
2004–2008	Elche	102	(4)
2008–2010	Málaga	2	(0)
2009–2010	→ Murcia (loan)	8	(0)
2010–2011	Castellón	10	(0)
Total		156	(5)

Managerial career
- 2014–2017: Roda (youth)
- 2017–2020: Villarreal C
- 2021–2022: Villarreal C
- 2022: Lleida Esportiu
- 2023–2024: USM Alger (assistant)
- 2024–2026: Guadalajara
- * Club domestic league appearances and goals

Pere Martí Castelló (Valencian pronunciation: [ˈpe.ɾe maɾˈti]; born 22 January 1982) is a Spanish former professional footballer who played as a defensive midfielder, currently a manager.

== Playing career ==
Born in Moncofa, Province of Castellón, Martí made his La Liga debut in the 2003–04 season with Villarreal CF, featuring heavily as the side finished eighth and scoring his only goal in a 2–1 away win against RCD Mallorca, on 18 April 2004. He added nine matches in their quarter-final run in the UEFA Cup, but was soon deemed surplus to requirements and left for neighbours Elche CF, in the Segunda División.

After just 11 appearances in his debut campaign, Martí became an essential first-team member as well as captain. At the end of 2007–08 he signed for Málaga CF, who had just returned to the top division; however, mainly because of injuries, he was not part of manager Antonio Tapia's plans in his first year.

Martí was loaned to Real Murcia CF of the second tier in August 2009, featuring rarely as the side were relegated. On 13 July 2010, he was released from his Málaga contract and immediately joined CD Castellón, recently relegated to Segunda División B.

== Coaching career ==
On 4 January 2011, aged only 28, Martí announced his retirement from professional football, citing his multiple physical problems as the main reason. He later rejoined his first club Villarreal, where he acted as youth coach and manager of the third senior team.

Subsequently, Martí was in charge of Segunda Federación sides Lleida Esportiu and CD Guadalajara. In between those spells, in the 2023–24 season, he had an assistant spell in Algeria with USM Alger.

On 12 January 2026, Martí was dismissed by Guadalajara after a run of one win in four months left them second-bottom in their group in the Primera Federación.

== Managerial statistics ==
As of 10 January 2026

Managerial record by team and tenure
Team	Nat	From	To	Record								Ref
Team	Nat	From	To	G	W	D	L	GF	GA	GD	Win %	Ref
Villarreal C	(Spain)	21 June 2017	8 July 2020	106	42	30	34	151	128	+23	39.62	
Villarreal C	(Spain)	10 June 2021	7 June 2022	36	14	9	13	52	39	+13	38.89	
Lleida Esportiu	(Spain)	9 June 2022	21 December 2022	16	4	4	8	13	13	+0	25.00	
Guadalajara	(Spain)	14 June 2024	12 January 2026	56	28	14	14	82	55	+27	50.00	
Career total				214	88	57	69	298	235	+63	41.12	—

== Honours ==
Villarreal

- UEFA Intertoto Cup: 2003
