= Óscar Clavell =

Spanish politician (born 1978)

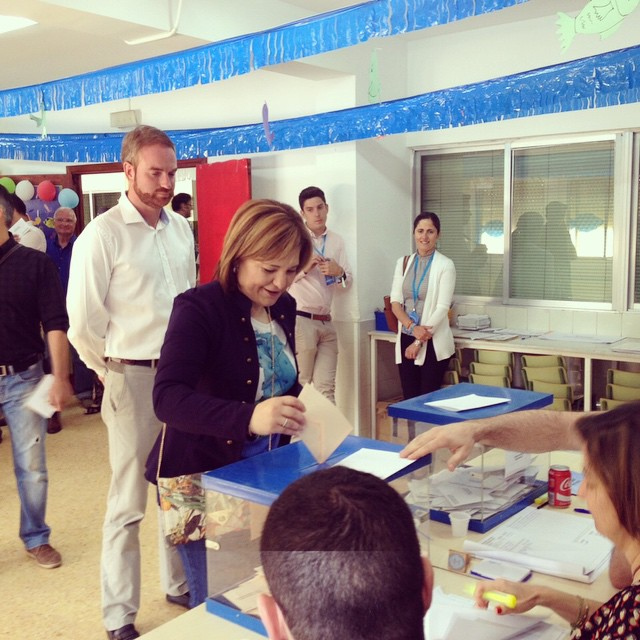
- Clavell in 2015

Member of the Congress of Deputies
- Incumbent
- Assumed office 13 January 2016
- Constituency: Castellón

Personal details
- Born: 7 September 1978 (age 47)
- Party: People's Party

Óscar Clavell López (born 7 September 1978) is a Spanish politician serving as a member of the Congress of Deputies since 2016. From 2011 to 2015, he served as mayor of La Vall d'Uixó.
