= Eslida =

- Municipality
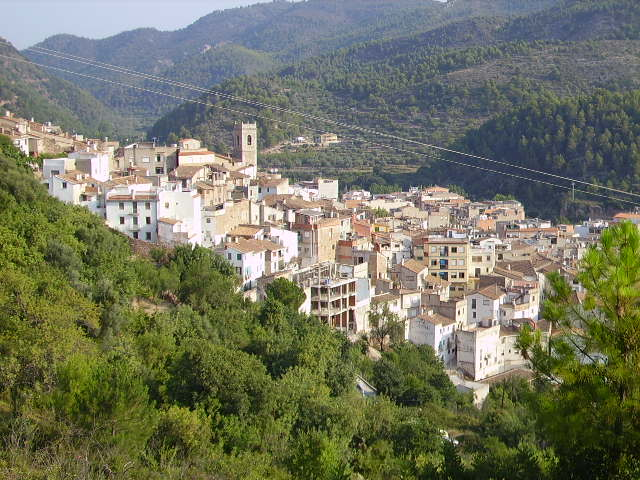

- Coat of arms
- Interactive map of Eslida
- Coordinates: 39°53′N 0°18′W
- Country: Spain
- Autonomous community: Valencian Community
- Province: Castellón
- Comarca: Plana Baixa

Area
  - Total: 18.1 km^{2} (7.0 sq mi)
- Elevation: 381 m (1,250 ft)

Population (2025-01-01)
  - Total: 815
  - Density: 45.0/km^{2} (117/sq mi)
- Time zone: UTC+1 (CET)
  - Summer (DST): UTC+2 (CEST)
- Postal code: 12528
- Website: https://www.eslida.es

Eslida is a municipality located in the province of Castellón, Valencian Community, Spain.
