= Pol Bueso =

Spanish footballer

Personal information
- Full name: Pol Bueso Paradís
- Date of birth: 27 April 1985 (age 41)
- Place of birth: Moncofa, Spain
- Height: 1.84 m (6 ft 1/2 in)
- Position: Centre-back

Team information
- Current team: UD Ourense
- Number: 3

Youth career
- Castellón

Senior career*
Years	Team	Apps	(Gls)
2005–2008	Castellón B	42	(0)
2007–2011	Castellón	66	(0)
2008	→ Ceuta (loan)	6	(1)
2011–2012	Valencia B	23	(0)
2012–2013	Salamanca	34	(1)
2013–2015	Albacete	43	(0)
2015	Gimnàstic	5	(0)
2015–2016	UCAM Murcia	20	(0)
2016–2019	Hércules	62	(1)
2019–2021	Pontevedra	27	(0)
2021–2024	Arenteiro	65	(0)
2024–	UD Ourense	39	(0)
- * Club domestic league appearances and goals as of 14 May 2026

Pol Bueso Paradís (born 27 April 1985) is a Spanish professional footballer who plays as a centre-back for UD Ourense.

== Career statistics ==
=== Club ===
As of match played 14 March 2021

Appearances and goals by club, season and competition
Club	Season	League			National Cup		Other		Total	
Club	Season	Division	Apps	Goals	Apps	Goals	Apps	Goals	Apps	Goals
Castellón	2005–06	Segunda División	0	0	0	0	—		0	0
Castellón	2006–07	Segunda División	0	0	0	0	—		0	0
Castellón	2007–08	Segunda División	3	0	1	0	—		4	0
Castellón	2008–09	Segunda División	15	0	3	0	—		18	0
Castellón	2009–10	Segunda División	20	0	1	0	—		21	0
Castellón	2010–11	Segunda División B	28	0	0	0	—		28	0
Castellón	Total		66	0	6	0	0	0	72	0
Ceuta (loan)	2007–08	Segunda División B	6	1	0	0	2 (Note: Appearance(s) in Promotion Playoffs)	0	8	1
Valencia B	2011–12	Segunda División B	23	0	0	0	—		23	0
Salamanca	2012–13	Segunda División B	34	1	0	0	—		34	1
Albacete	2013–14	Segunda División B	36	0	1	0	2	0	39	0
Albacete	2014–15	Segunda División	7	0	3	0	—		10	0
Albacete	Total		43	0	4	0	2	0	49	0
Gimnàstic	2014–15	Segunda División B	5	0	0	0	2	0	7	0
UCAM Murcia	2015–16	Segunda División B	20	0	2	0	3	0	25	0
Hércules	2016–17	Segunda División B	33	1	4	0	—		37	1
Hércules	2017–18	Segunda División B	19	0	0	0	—		19	0
Hércules	2018–19	Segunda División B	10	0	0	0	—		10	0
Hércules	Total		62	1	4	0	0	0	66	1
Pontevedra	2019–20	Segunda División B	16	0	1	0	—		17	0
Pontevedra	2020–21	Segunda División B	6	0	2	0	—		8	0
Pontevedra	Total		22	0	3	0	0	0	25	0
Career total			281	3	19	0	9	0	309	3
