= Javi Costa =

Spanish footballer

Personal information
- Full name: Javier Costa Estirado
- Date of birth: 18 April 1997 (age 29)
- Place of birth: Almassora, Spain
- Height: 1.71 m (5 ft 7 1/2 in)
- Position: Right back

Youth career
- Villarreal

Senior career*
Years	Team	Apps	(Gls)
2005–2010	Villarreal B		
2010–2013	Borriol		
- * Club domestic league appearances and goals

Javier 'Javi' Costa Estirado (born 18 April 1997) is a Spanish former footballer who played as a right defender.
