= Ribesalbes =

- Municipality
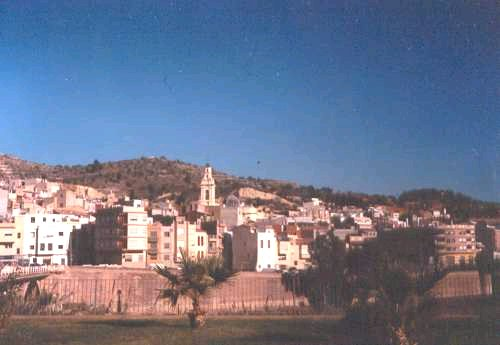

- Coat of arms
- Interactive map of Ribesalbes
- Coordinates: 40°1′19″N 0°16′40″W
- Country: Spain
- Autonomous community: Valencian Community
- Province: Castellón
- Comarca: Plana Baixa

Area
  - Total: 8.6 km^{2} (3.3 sq mi)
- Elevation: 172 m (564 ft)

Population (2025-01-01)
  - Total: 1,191
  - Density: 140/km^{2} (360/sq mi)
- Time zone: UTC+1 (CET)
  - Summer (DST): UTC+2 (CEST)
- Postal code: 12210
- Website: http://www.ribesalbes.es

Ribesalbes is a municipality located in the province of Castellón, Valencian Community, Spain.

In the 1780s, Joseph Ferrer founded an earthenware factory in Ribesalbes.
