= La Vilavella =

- Municipality
- Flag Coat of arms

- Location of La Vilavella in the Province of Castellón Location of La Vilavella in the Valencian Community Location of La Vilavella in Spain
- Coordinates: 39°51′N 0°11′W
- Country: Spain
- Autonomous community: Valencian Community
- Province: Castellón
- Comarca: Plana Baixa

Area
  - Total: 6.2 km^{2} (2.4 sq mi)
- Elevation: 38 m (125 ft)

Population (2025-01-01)
  - Total: 3,054
  - Density: 490/km^{2} (1,300/sq mi)
- Time zone: UTC+1 (CET)
  - Summer (DST): UTC+2 (CEST)
- Postal code: 12526
- Website: http://www.lavilavella.es

La Vilavella is a municipality located in the province of Castellón, Valencian Community, Spain.
