= Betxí =

- Municipality
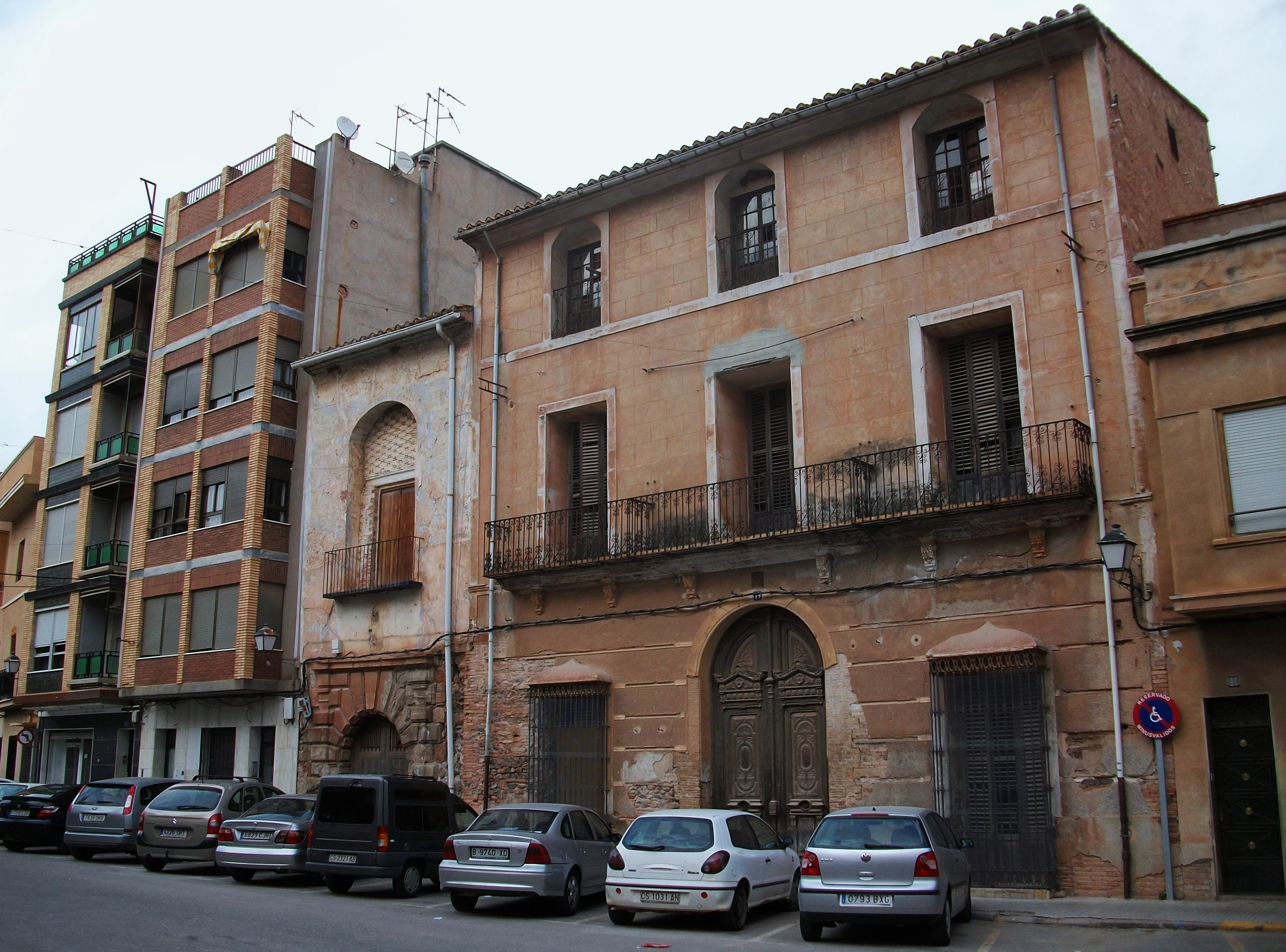

- Flag Coat of arms

- Location in Spain
- Coordinates: 39°55′42″N 0°11′53″W
- Country: Spain
- Autonomous community: Valencian Community
- Province: Castelló
- Comarca: Plana Baixa
- Judicial district: Nules

Area
  - Total: 21.4 km^{2} (8.3 sq mi)
- Elevation: 102 m (335 ft)

Population (2025-01-01)
  - Total: 5,659
  - Density: 264/km^{2} (685/sq mi)
- Demonym(s): Betxinenc, betxinenca
- Time zone: UTC+1 (CET)
  - Summer (DST): UTC+2 (CEST)
- Postal code: 12549
- Official language(s): Valencia and Spanish

Betxí (Spanish: Bechí) is a municipality in the comarca of Plana Baixa in the province of Castellón (Valencian Community), Spain.

Betxí is famous for its international Rock Music Festival Sant Antoni Pop Festival

== See also ==
- List of municipalities in Castelló
- Roman Catholic Diocese of Teruel and Albarracín
- Roman Catholic Diocese of Tortosa
