= Almassora =

Almassora Almazora
- Town and municipality
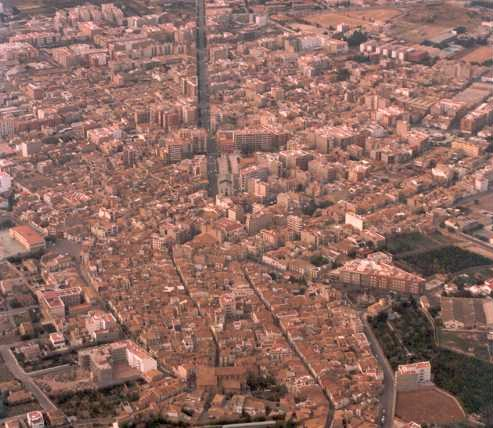

- Coat of arms

- Location of Almassora in the Province of Castellón Location of Almassora in the Valencian Community Location of Almassora in Spain
- Coordinates: 39°56′25″N 0°3′45″W
- Country: Spain
- Autonomous community: Valencian Community
- Province: Castellón
- Comarca: Plana Alta
- Judicial district: Villarreal

Government
  - Alcaldessa (Mayoress): María Tormo (2023-) (PP)

Area
  - Total: 33 km^{2} (13 sq mi)
- Elevation: 31 m (102 ft)

Population (2025-01-01)
  - Total: 29,159
  - Density: 880/km^{2} (2,300/sq mi)
- Demonyms: Almassoran almassorí, -ina (Val.) almazorín, -ina (Sp.)
- Official language(s): Valencian; Spanish
- Linguistic area: Valencian
- Time zone: UTC+1 (CET)
  - Summer (DST): UTC+2 (CEST)
- Postal code: 12550
- Dialing code: 964
- Website: Official website

Almassora, (Note: Pronunciation of Almassora: Valencian: [almaˈsoɾa]) in Valencian (known in Spanish as Almazora), (Note: Pronunciation of Almazora (unofficial): Spanish: [almaˈθoɾa]) is a town and municipality in the comarca of Plana Alta, Valencian Community, Spain.

== Urbanized areas ==
- Almassora
- La Platja
- L'Horta
- El Secà
- Polígon industrial

== History ==
There are ancient Iberian remains within the municipal term. Its present location is from Andalusī origin and it is said the place is named after al-Manṣūr ibn Abī `Amer (Almansor in Valencian), hajib and de facto ruler under Umayyad caliph of Córdoba Hishām II.

James I of Aragon conquered the town from the Andalusīs in 1234. the municipal charter was given in 1237. In 1616 a channel was built to bring the water from the Millars River to the town And in 1647 the Ermita de Santa Quiteria was built.

== Notable people ==
- Robert Juan-Cantavella
- Javi Costa (Javier 'Javi' Costa Estirado), footballer
- Miguel Ángel Tena, retired footballer

== See also ==
- List of municipalities in Castellón
