= Santa Quiteria Chapel (Almassora) =

Church building in Almassora, Spain

Coordinates: 39.9547°N 0.0950°W

The Santa Quiteria Chapel is a Catholic chapel located in the municipality of Almassora, (Castellón Province, Spain). It was documented in the first half of the seventeenth century.

== History ==
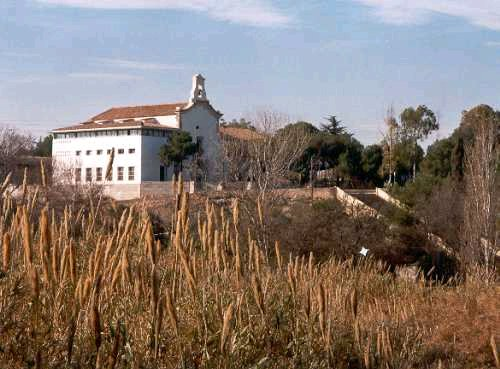
The Santa Quiteria Hermitage in Almassora

This area was likely populated long before a 1330 contract mentioned a church next to the Mijares. Records describe religious processions to neighbouring towns. In 1394, the inhabitants of Vila-real, mentioned a town named Almassora, which is most likely Santa Quiteria. A payment was made in 1495 to a hermit, to add a cell to the river's bridge, and a fifteenth-century coin was found between the corners during roof repairs.

== Military hospital ==
1647 it is turned into a refuge and a hospital, driven by the devastating plague. It was reconstructed and widened when the plague ended. In the War of the French, at the beginning of the 19th century, it served as a French military field hospital. It was rehabilitated for religious purposes in 1829.

== Design ==
The present Hermitage is a single story with simple steeples. The design is from 1682, according to Sarthou Carreres. It underwent work in 1726, directed by Jose Vilavalle, who built the espadaña, the pulpit, part of the roof, the sacristy, the steps of the altar, the pavement and remodelled the outside. The pulpit, the center, and the main altar disappeared, from 1726. It was consecrated again, after the 1936-1939 war ended, with a new image created by the Almassoran sculptor, Enrique Serra. It underwent several renovations in 1984 and 1991. To the left of the presbytery sits a painting by Enrique Limo containing a scene of the life of the saint. The bell dates from 1940.
