= Almenara, Spain =

Almenara
- Municipality and town
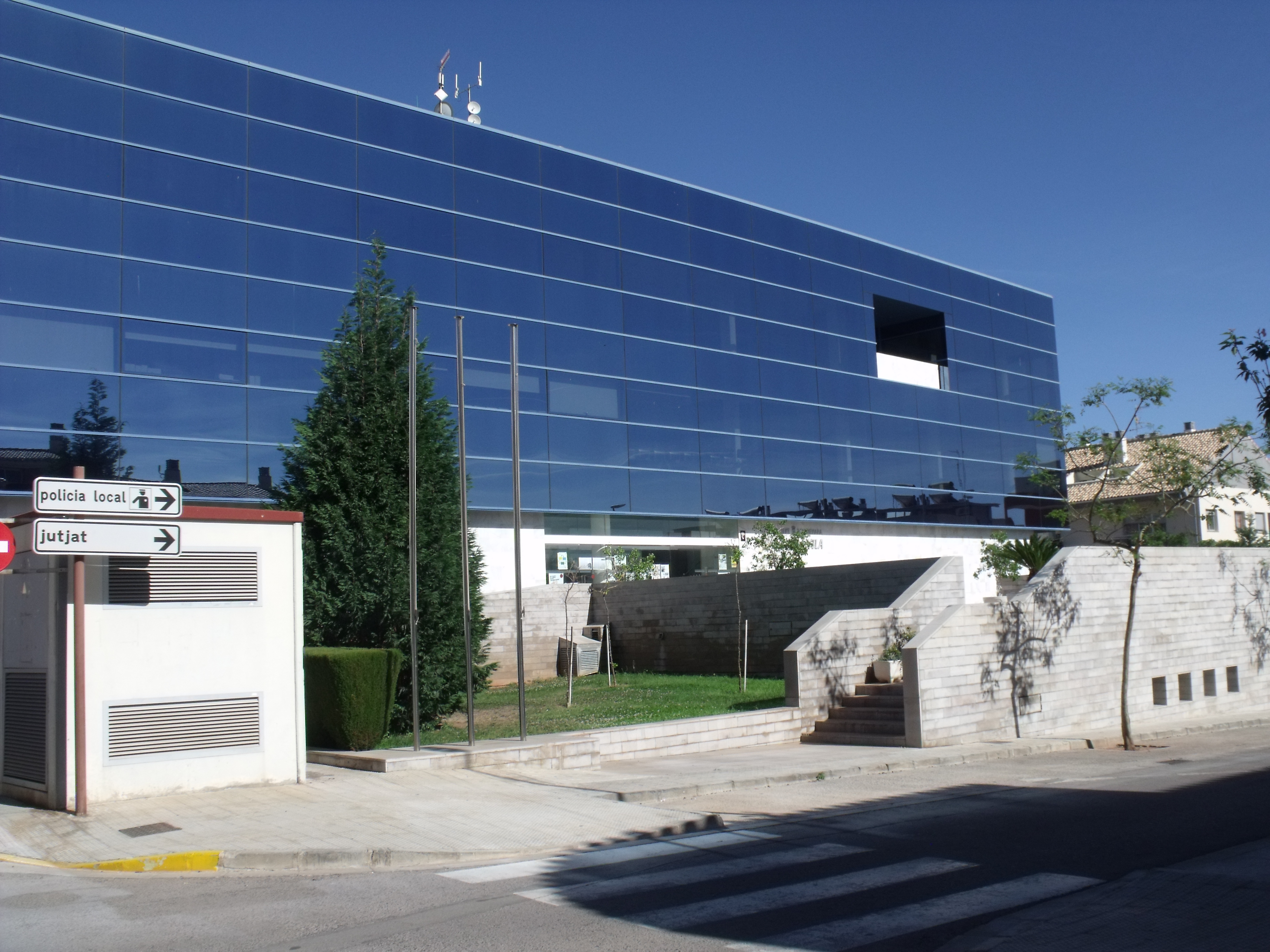
- Town hall

- Coat of arms

- Location of Almenara in Spain Almenara (Valencian Community) Almenara (Spain)
- Coordinates: 39°45′12″N 0°13′32″W
- Country: Spain
- Autonomous community: Valencian Community
- Province: Castellón
- Comarca: Plana Baixa

Area
  - Total: 27.6 km^{2} (10.7 sq mi)
- Elevation: 26 m (85 ft)

Population (2025-01-01)
  - Total: 6,813
  - Density: 247/km^{2} (639/sq mi)
- Time zone: UTC+1 (CET)
  - Summer (DST): UTC+2 (CEST)
- Postal code: 12590
- Website: http://www.almenara.es

Almenara is a municipality located in the province of Castellón, Valencian Community, Spain.

== Notable people ==
- Jaume Doménech, footballer

== See also ==
- List of municipalities in Castellón
