= Mijares (river) =

River in Spain

Coordinates: 39°54′31.02″N 0°0′44.18″E

Mijares / Millars
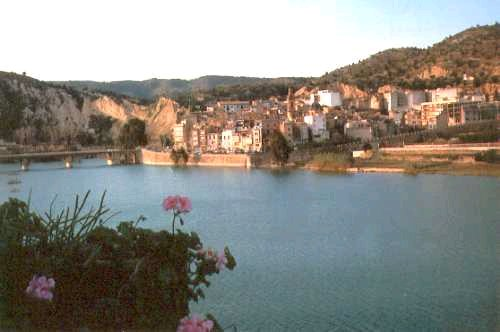
- The Mijares River at the Sitjar dam with Ribesalbes town in the background

Location
- Country: Spain

Physical characteristics
- Source
  - location: Sierra de Gúdar, El Castellar
  - elevation: 1,600 m (5,200 ft)
- Mouth
  - location: Mediterranean Sea
  - elevation: 0 m (0 ft)
- Length: 156 km (97 mi)
- Basin size: 4,028 km^{2} (1,555 sq mi)
- Discharge
  - average: 14.72 m^{3}/s (520 cu ft/s)

The Mijares or Millars (Spanish: Mijares, Catalan: Millars, Aragonese: Millars) is a river in Aragon and the Valencian Community, eastern Spain. It flows into the Mediterranean Sea between Almassora and Burriana. The Mijares River marks the southernmost limit of the Catalan Mediterranean System.

This river originates at a height of 1,600 m in the Sierra de Gúdar, Sistema Ibérico. It is 156 km long, with a 4,028 km^{2} wide basin and an average flow of 14.72 m^{3} per second at Cirat. This river is the main source of irrigation water for agriculture in the Plana Baixa comarca.

== See also ==
- List of rivers of Spain
