= Moncofa =

- Flag Coat of arms

- Location of Moncofa in the Province of Castellón Location of Moncofa in the Valencian Community Location of Moncofa in Spain
- Coordinates: 39°48′9″N 0°8′2″W
- Country: Spain
- Autonomous Community: Valencian Community
- Province: Castellón
- Comarca: Plana Baixa
- Judicial district: Nules
- Most spoken language: Valencian
- Temperatures: Highest 42 °C / Lowest 3 °C
- Precipitation mm: 509.51 mm. year

Government
  - Type: Ayuntamiento
  - Mayor: Wenceslao Alós Valls. (PP)

Area
  - Total: 14.53 km^{2} (5.61 sq mi)
- Elevation: 6 m (20 ft)

Population (2025-01-01)
  - Total: 8,339
  - Density: 573.9/km^{2} (1,486/sq mi)
- Demonym: Moncofino/Moncofina (Spanish)
- Time zone: CET (GMT +1)
  - Summer (DST): CEST (GMT +2)
- Postcode: 12600
- Website: Web Oficial de Moncófar

Moncofa (in valencian and officially, in Spanish Moncófar) is a municipality of the Province of Castellón in the Valencian Community, Spain.

== Notable people ==
- Pere Martí, footballer
- Pol Bueso, footballer
