= Alfondeguilla =

- Municipality and town
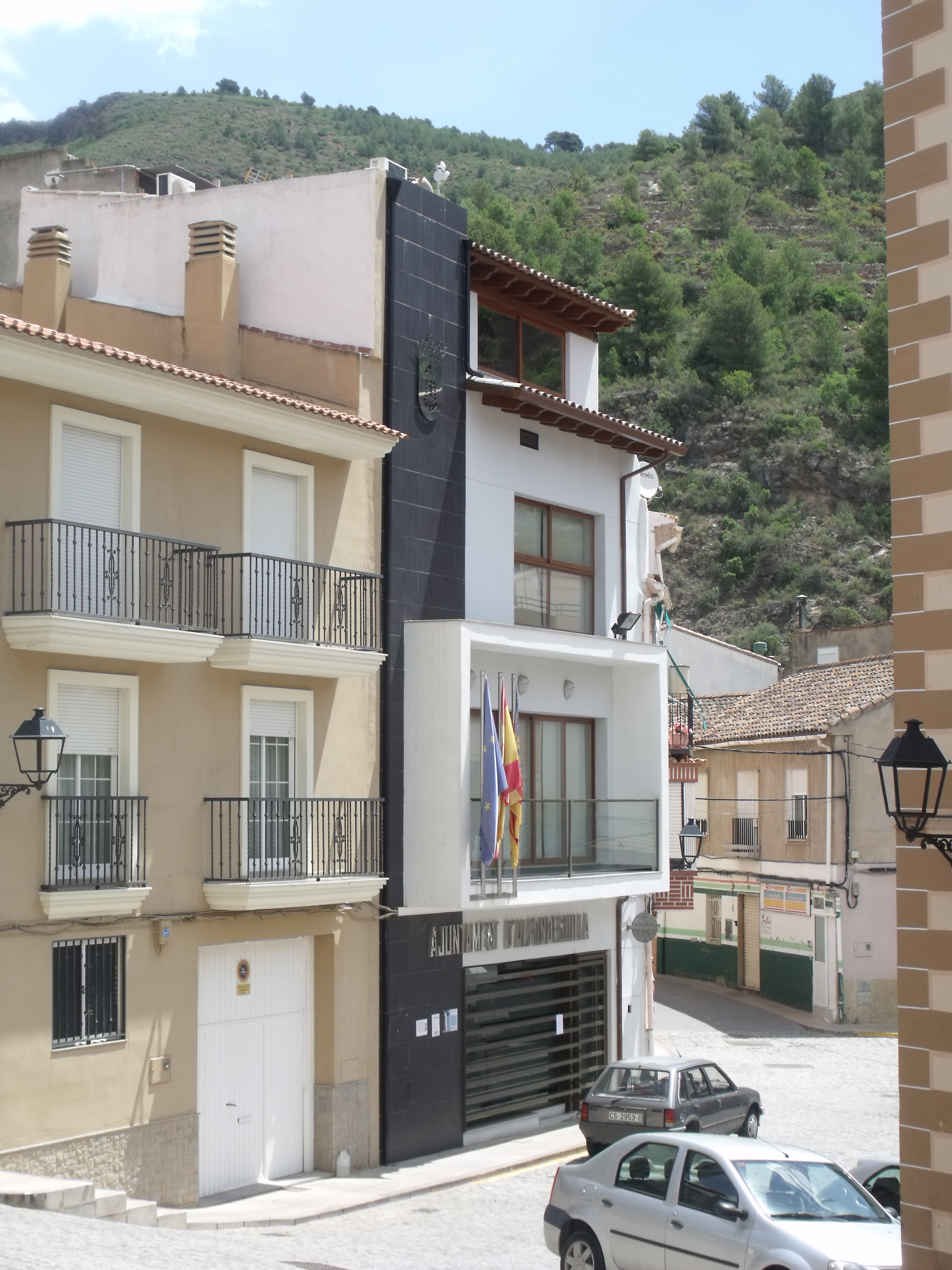
- Town Hall

- Coat of arms
- Interactive map of Alfondeguilla
- Coordinates: 39°50′N 0°16′W
- Country: Spain
- Autonomous community: Valencian Community
- Province: Castellón
- Comarca: Plana Baixa

Area
  - Total: 28.3 km^{2} (10.9 sq mi)
- Elevation: 219 m (719 ft)

Population (2025-01-01)
  - Total: 881
  - Density: 31.1/km^{2} (80.6/sq mi)
- Time zone: UTC+1 (CET)
  - Summer (DST): UTC+2 (CEST)
- Postal code: 12609
- Website: http://www.alfondeguilla.es

Alfondeguilla is a municipality located in the province of Castellón, Valencian Community, Spain.

== Evolution of the population ==
Population
1563	1795	1845	1873	1900	1940	1950	1960	1970	1985	1990	1995	2000	2005	2009	2013	2014	2022
500	180	388	738	943	815	1009	1027	968	957	921	916	908	899	860	876	893	877

== See also ==
- List of municipalities in Castellón
