= Artana, Spain =

Artana
- Municipality and town
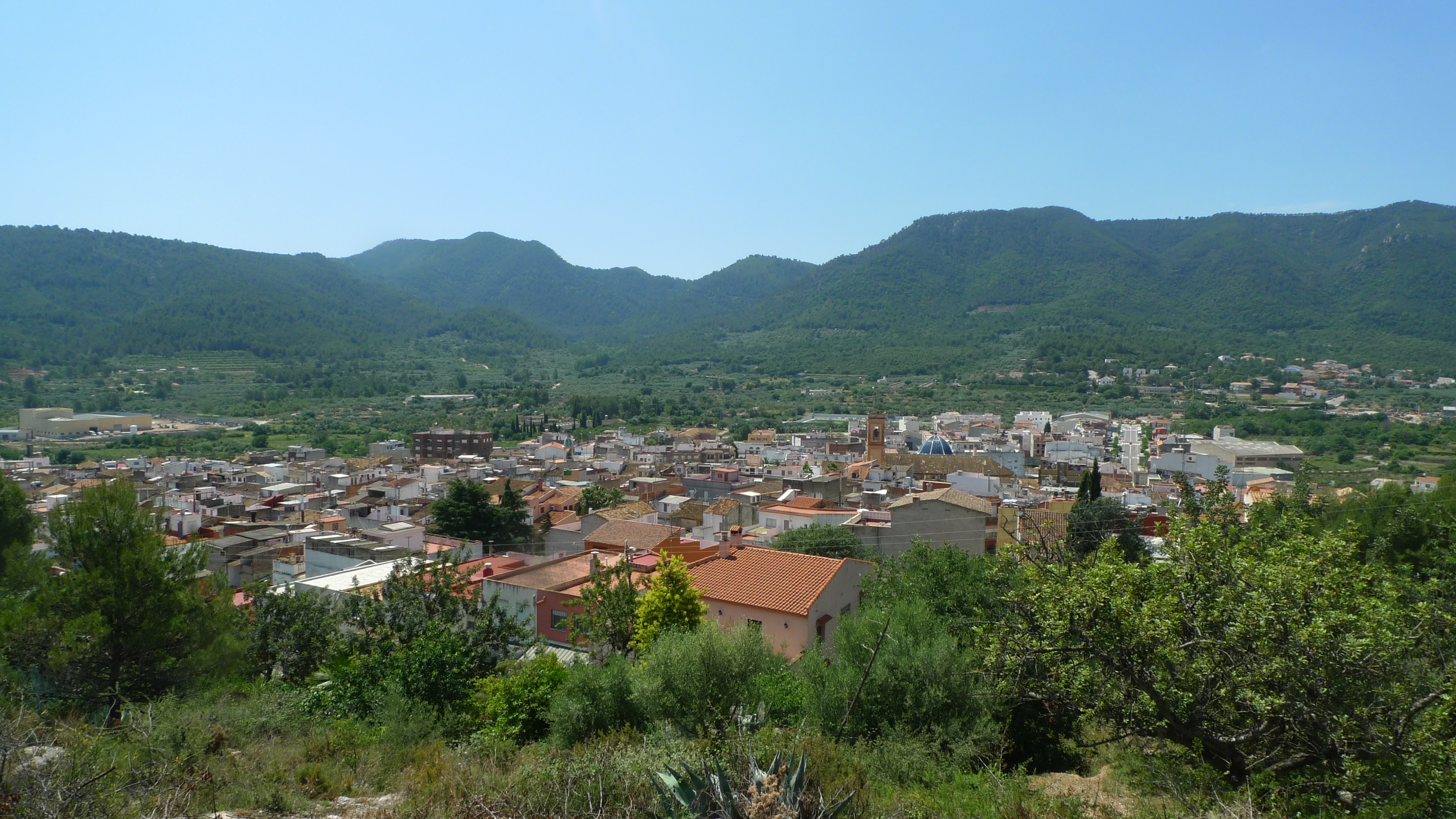

- Coat of arms

- Location in Spain
- Coordinates: 39°53′N 0°15′W
- Country: Spain
- Autonomous community: Valencian Community
- Province: Castellón
- Comarca: Plana Baixa

Area
  - Total: 36.3 km^{2} (14.0 sq mi)
- Elevation: 261 m (856 ft)

Population (2025-01-01)
  - Total: 1,993
  - Density: 54.9/km^{2} (142/sq mi)
- Time zone: UTC+1 (CET)
  - Summer (DST): UTC+2 (CEST)
- Postal code: 12527
- Website: Local Website

Artana is a municipality located in the province of Castellón, Valencian Community, Spain. According to the 2014 census, the municipality has a population of 1,958 inhabitants.

== Notable people ==
- Bruno Soriano, footballer

== See also ==
- List of municipalities in Castellón
