= La Llosa =

- Municipality
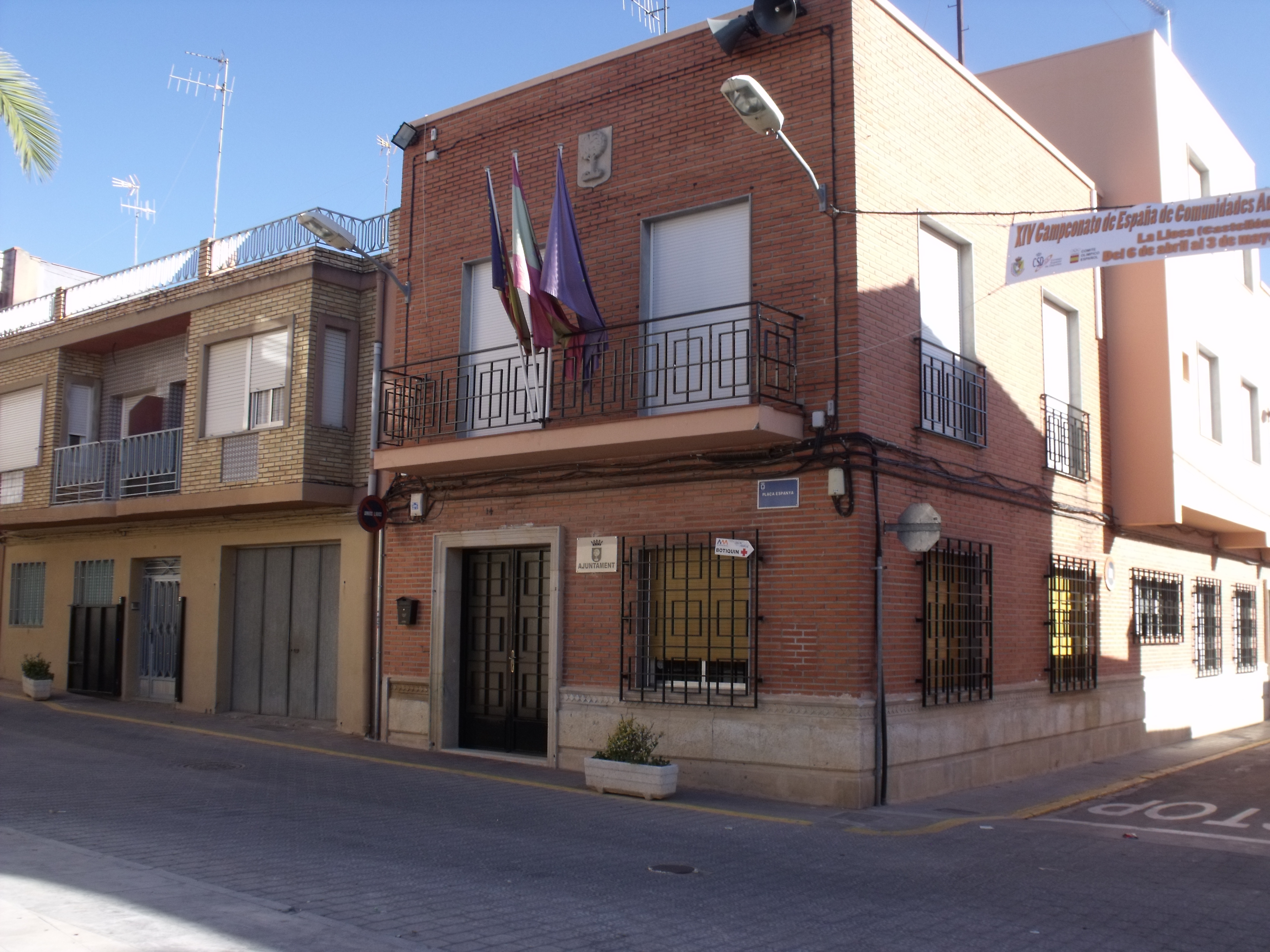
- Municipal office

- Flag Coat of arms

- Location within Spain
- Coordinates: 39°46′06″N 0°12′18″W
- Country: Spain
- Autonomous community: Valencian Community
- Province: Castellón
- Comarca: Plana Baixa

Government
  - Major: Joaquín José Llopis Casals

Area
  - Total: 10 km^{2} (3.9 sq mi)
- Elevation: 19 m (62 ft)

Population (2025-01-01)
  - Total: 1,033
  - Density: 100/km^{2} (270/sq mi)
- Time zone: UTC+1 (CET)
  - Summer (DST): UTC+2 (CEST)
- Postal code: 12591
- Website: http://www.lallosa.es

La Llosa is a municipality located in the province of Castellón, Valencian Community, Spain.
