= Nules =

Nules Nules La pallaya de España
- Town
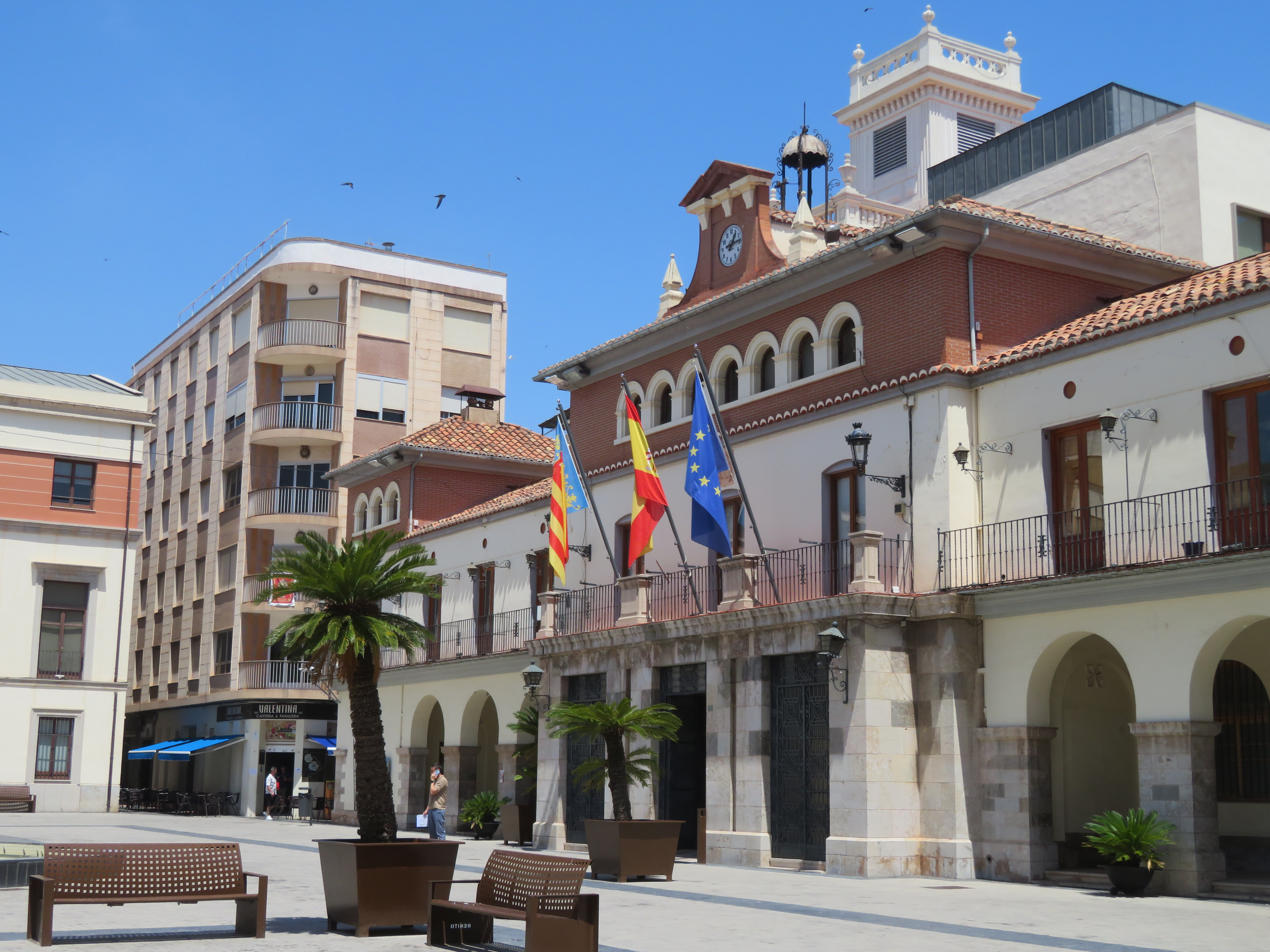
- Town hall

- Coat of arms

- Location of Nules in the Province of Castellón Location of Nules in the Valencian Community Location of Nules in Spain Location in Valencian Community
- Coordinates: 39°51′9″N 0°9′2″W
- Country: Spain
- Autonomous Community: Valencian Community
- Province: Castellón
- Comarca: Plana Baixa

Government
  - Mayor: David García (CCD)

Area
  - Total: 50 km^{2} (19 sq mi)
- Elevation (AMSL): 13 m (43 ft)

Population (2025-01-01)
  - Total: 14,315
  - Density: 290/km^{2} (740/sq mi)
- Time zone: UTC+1 (CET)
  - Summer (DST): UTC+2 (CEST (GMT +2))
- Postal code: 12520
- Area code: +34 (Spain) + 964 (Castellón)
- Website: www.nules.es

Nules is a town in eastern Spain, in the province of Castellón (Valencian Community). Located 18 km to the south of the province's capital, at 13 m over sea level, it has 13,750 inhabitants (2010 data), living in Nules Town, Nules Beach and Mascarell.

Nules gives its name to the Nules variety of Clementine, which was first bred here in 1953. It is the most popular variety of Clementine grown in Spain.

The municipality includes Mascarell, a historical village.

== Notable people ==
- Sergi Canós, footballer
- Rosita Amores
- Asensio Nebot, guerilla leader
